= BGW =

BGW may refer to:

== Places ==
- BGW, the IATA airport code of Baghdad International Airport
- GB-BGW, the ISO 3166-2 code for Blaenau Gwent, a Welsh county borough
- Botanischer Garten der Universität Würzburg, a botanical garden in Bavaria, Germany
- Botanischer Garten Wuppertal, a botanical garden in North Rhine-Westphalia, Germany
- Busch Gardens Williamsburg, a theme park in Virginia, USA

== Organizations ==
- BGW Systems, an audio amplifier manufacturer
- Bundesverband der deutschen Gas- und Wasserwirtschaft, the German federal gas and water industry group
- Bahngesellschaft Waldhof AG, a rail company in Mannheim, Germany

== Other uses ==
- BGW (Blue Gene Watson), a protein folding simulation performed on the Blue Gene supercomputer
- Bala Ganapathi William (born 1990), Malaysian actor and director known professionally as BGW
