= Botanischer Garten der Stadt Neuss =

Municipal botanical garden in Germany

Coordinates: 51.1896°N 6.6923°E

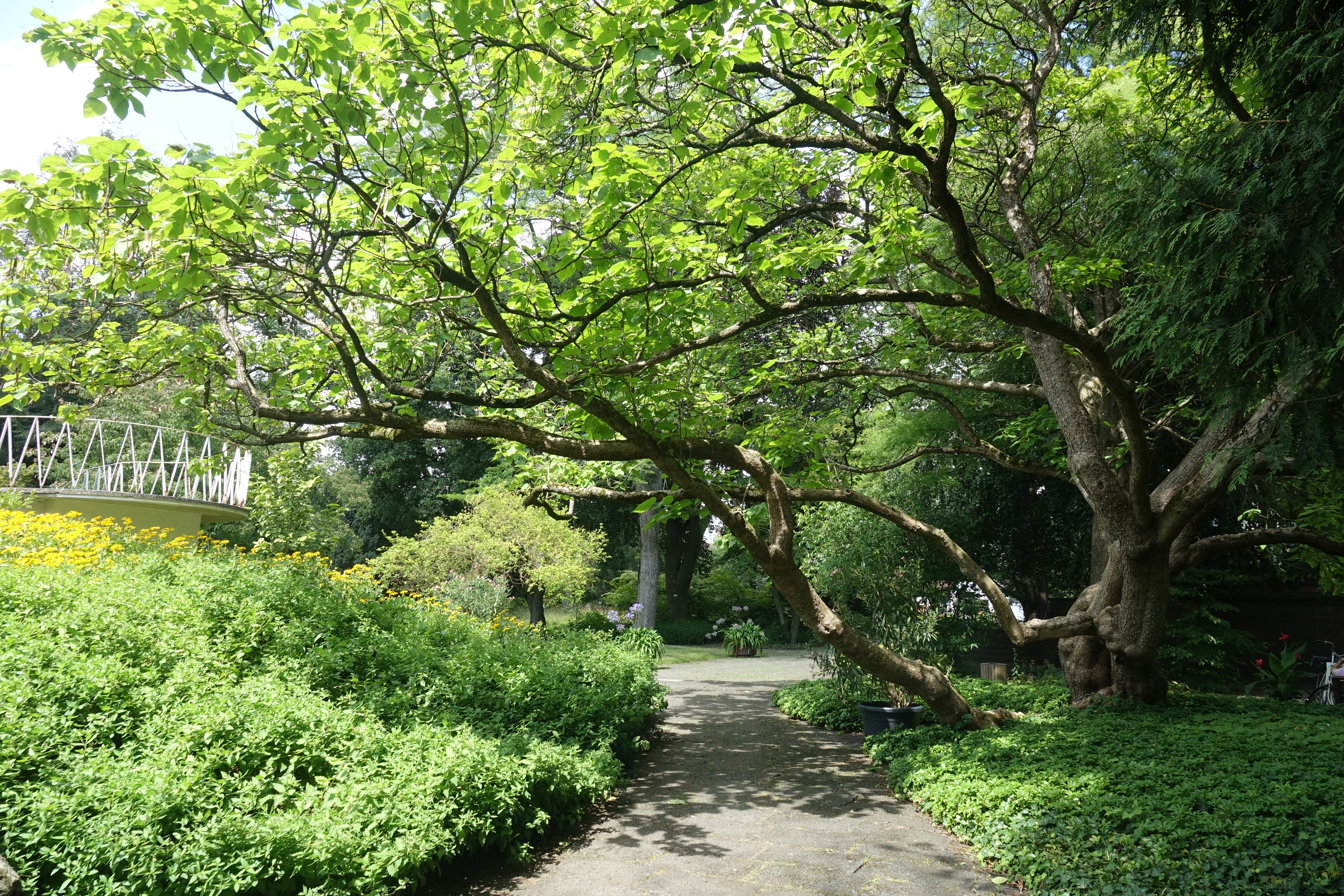

The Botanischer Garten der Stadt Neuss is a municipal botanical garden located at the intersection of Weingartstrasse and Körnerstrasse, Neuss, North Rhine-Westphalia, Germany. It is open weekdays without charge.

The garden was established in the early 20th century, and is a small park with flowers, shrubs, and uncommon trees, as well as two aviaries and a small pond. Its greenhouses contains over 100 varieties of cactus and succulents, as well as orchids and bromeliads.

== See also ==
- List of botanical gardens in Germany
