= Botanischer Garten der Stadt Hof =

Botanical garden in Bavaria, Germany

Coordinates: 50°19′28″N 11°56′13″E

The Botanischer Garten der Stadt Hof is a municipal botanical garden located in the Theresienstein park, at Alte Plauener Strasse 16, Hof, Bavaria, Germany. It is open daily in the warmer months without charge.

The garden started sometime before 1929 as a municipal garden for teaching students, and from 1929 to 1932 was developed as a botanical garden by city gardener Rudolf Hutschenreiter. During World War II, it was used primarily for vegetables. Reconstruction began after the war, to new designs created by gardener Herrmann Fuchs from 1958 to 1998.

The garden is divided into two major areas: a geometrical Rosarium, and a landscaped garden with alpine garden, Jura Mountains collection, lily pond, shade area, medicinal herb garden, heathers, succulents, and expansive perennials plantings. Plantings include both local species and varieties from around the world.

Bothanical garden

== See also ==
- List of botanical gardens in Germany
