= Botanischer Garten der Universität Ulm =

Botanical garden and arboretum in Baden-Württemberg, Germany

Coordinates: 48.4194°N 9.9666°E

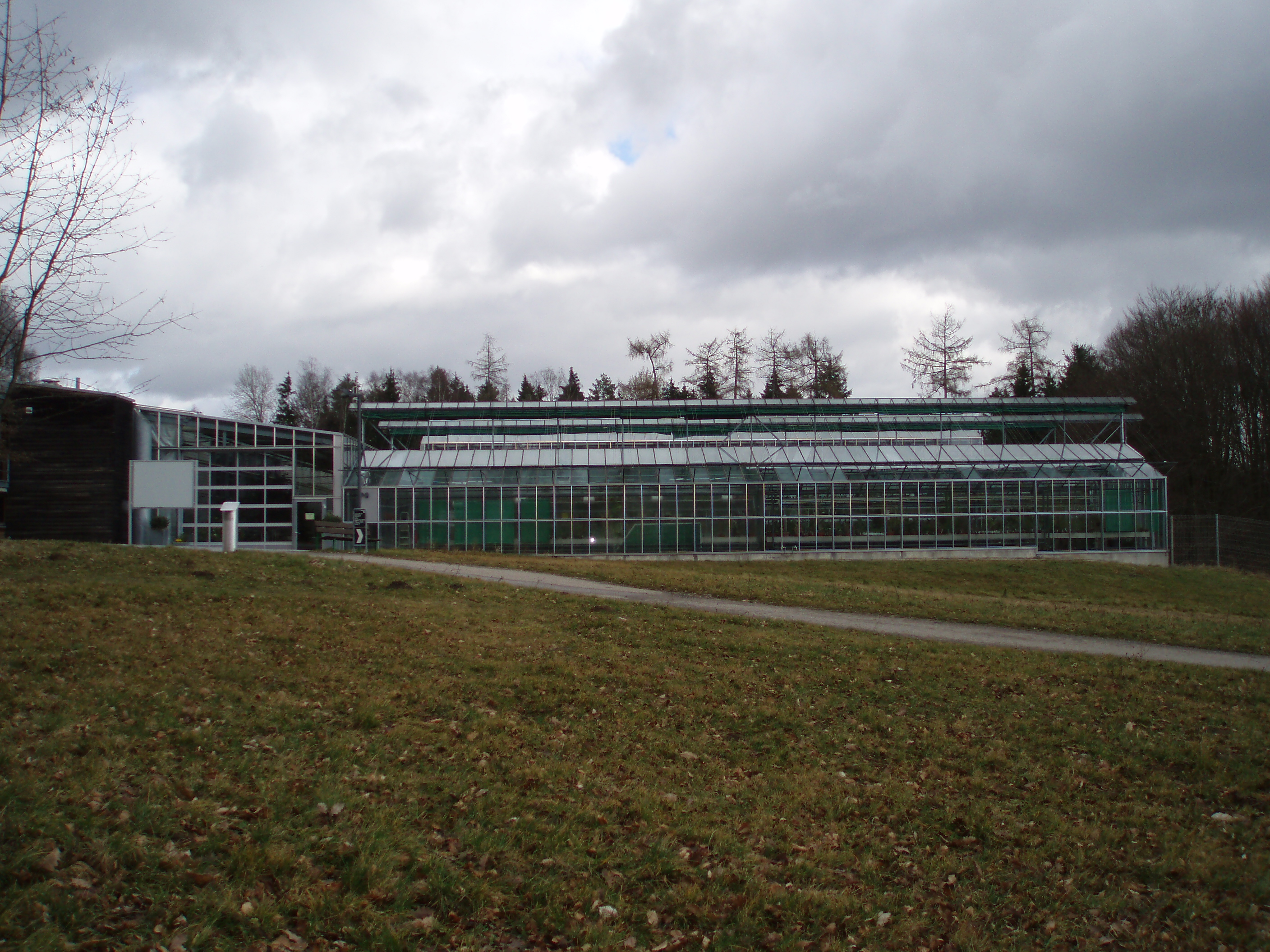
Botanischer Garten der Universität Ulm

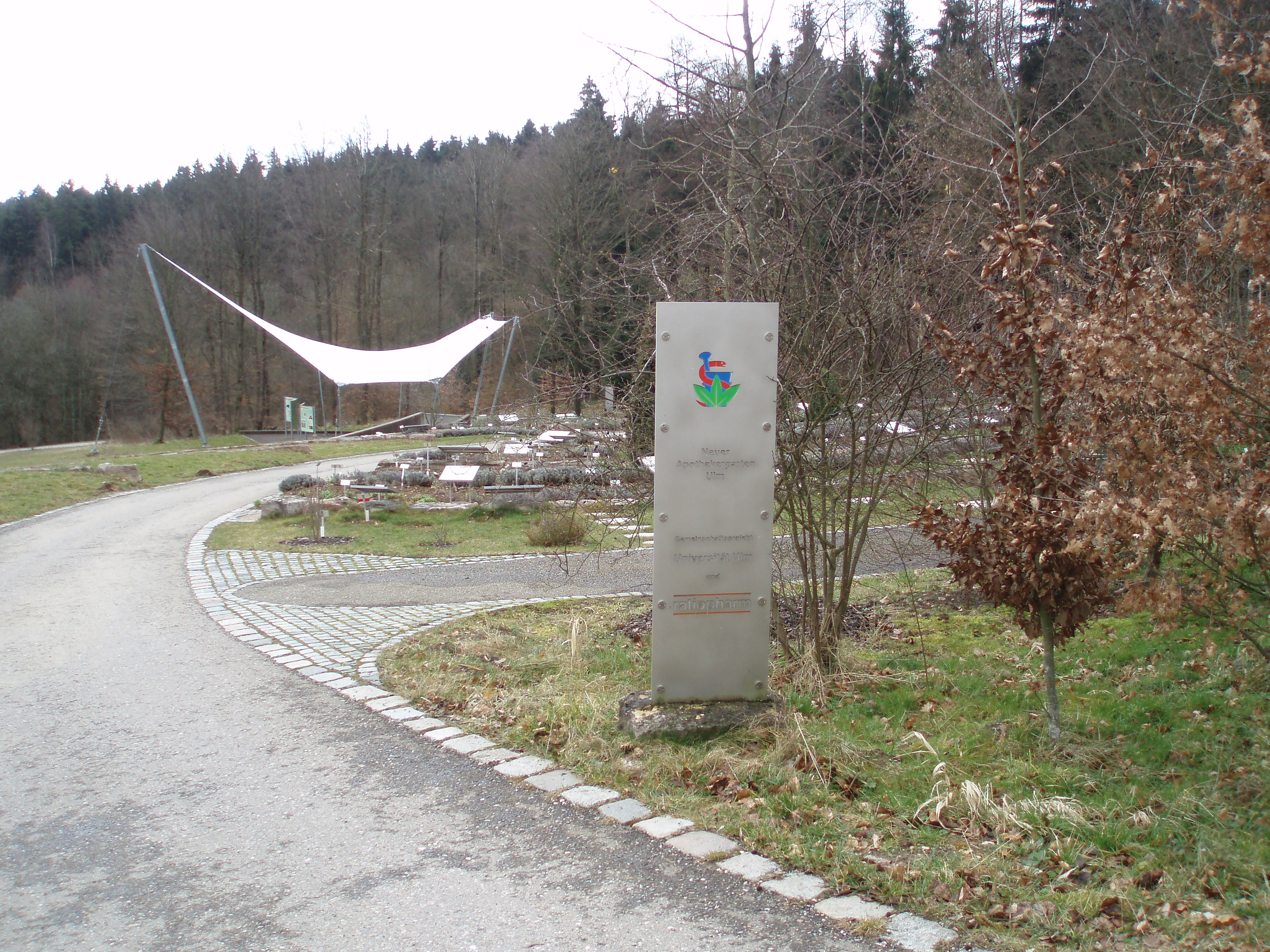
Herb garden

The Botanischer Garten der Universität Ulm (28 hectares), also known as the Botanischer Garten Ulm, is a botanical garden and arboretum maintained by the University of Ulm. It is located at Hans-Krebs-Weg, Ulm, Baden-Württemberg, Germany.

The garden was begun in 1981 on a former shooting range southeast of the university on the Upper Eselsberg. Its first greenhouses were built in 1986, its arboretum created in the years 1992–1996, and two additional tropical greenhouses were added in 1997. A farmer's garden was created in 1998, a rose garden in 1999–2000, and in 2001 an herb garden was created in cooperation with the pharmaceutical company Ratiopharm.

Today the garden contains a medicinal garden, daylily garden, arboretum, pond, rose garden, cottage garden, and meadow. Its herbarium contains some 80,000 documents with a focus on Europe, South America, and Central America, including a tropical collection of about 50,000 specimens, about 20,000 specimens of mosses and lichens, and some 10,000 phanerogams. The garden is open to the public on weekdays at various hours.

== See also ==
- List of botanical gardens in Germany
