= Botanischer Garten Kassel =

Botanical garden in Hesse, Germany

Coordinates: 51°17′46″N 9°28′49″E

The Botanischer Garten Kassel, also known as the Botanischer Garten der Stadt Kassel, is a municipal botanical garden located in the Park Schönfeld at Bosestraße 15, Kassel, Hesse, Germany. It is open daily without charge.

The garden was first created in 1912 as a school garden, but in 1982 converted into a general green area. Restoration began in 2002, with the aim of gradually re-establishing the garden's 1950s-era features and creating new theme gardens. Current plantings include a rose garden, a medicinal herb garden, and perennials. A cactus house exhibits 300 cacti and succulents.

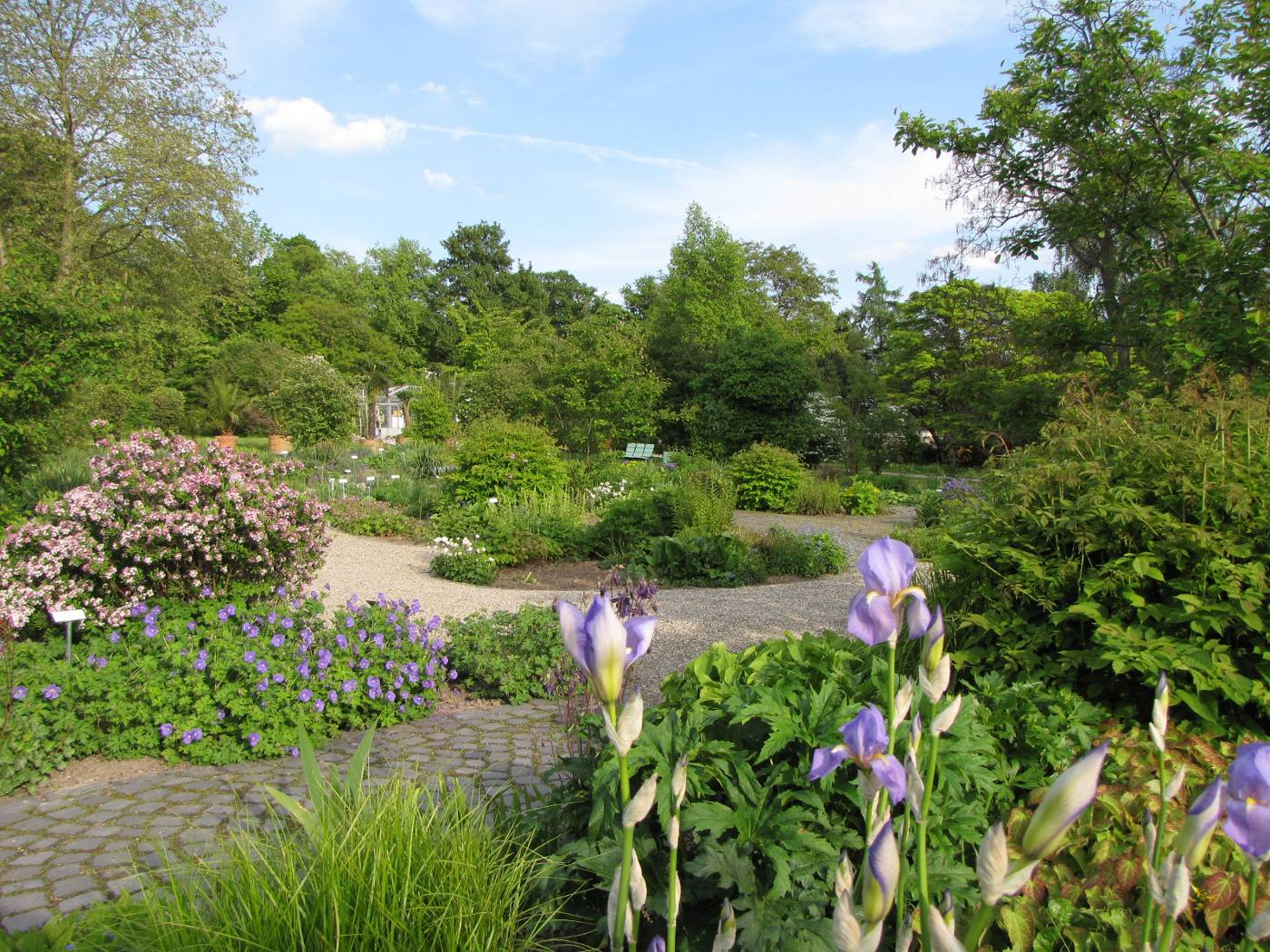
Botanischer Garten Kassel

== See also ==
- List of botanical gardens in Germany
