= Botanischer Schulgarten Burg =

Botanical garden

Coordinates: 52°23′55″N 9°41′35″E

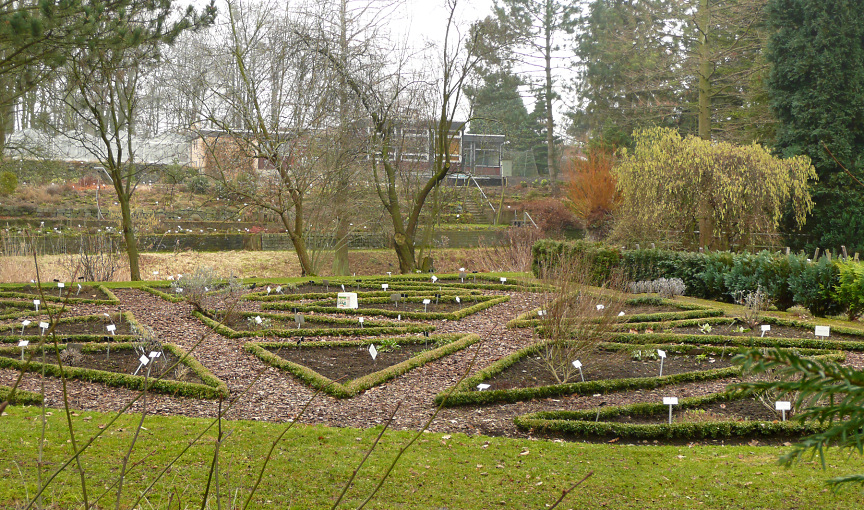
The garden

The Botanischer Schulgarten Burg (7.5 hectares) is a botanical garden for students maintained by the municipal Schulbiologiezentrum Hannover organization. It is located at Vinnhorster Weg 2, Hannover, Lower Saxony, Germany, and open weekdays.

The garden was established in 1927 to provide practical botany experiences to students. As of 1974, it became the headquarters of the Schulbiologiezentrum Hannover, which also maintains schools in three other locations (Freiluftschule Burg, Zooschule Hannover, Botanischer Schulgarten Linden).

Its grounds contain a range of habitats including ponds, alder and birch groves, deciduous forests, and meadows, in which students can understand scientific and environmental topics. It also contains theme gardens as follows: genetics and evolution, herbs, vegetables, fruit, aromatic plants, geographic gardens, sun and energy, small organic experiments, and insects. The garden's perennial nursery (1500 m²) raises plants for school gardens, including a tropical greenhouse (200 m²) cultivating rainforest plants.

== See also ==
- List of botanical gardens in Germany
