= Natural History Museum, Aschaffenburg =

Museum in Bavaria, Germany

Coordinates: 49°58′26″N 9°08′53″E

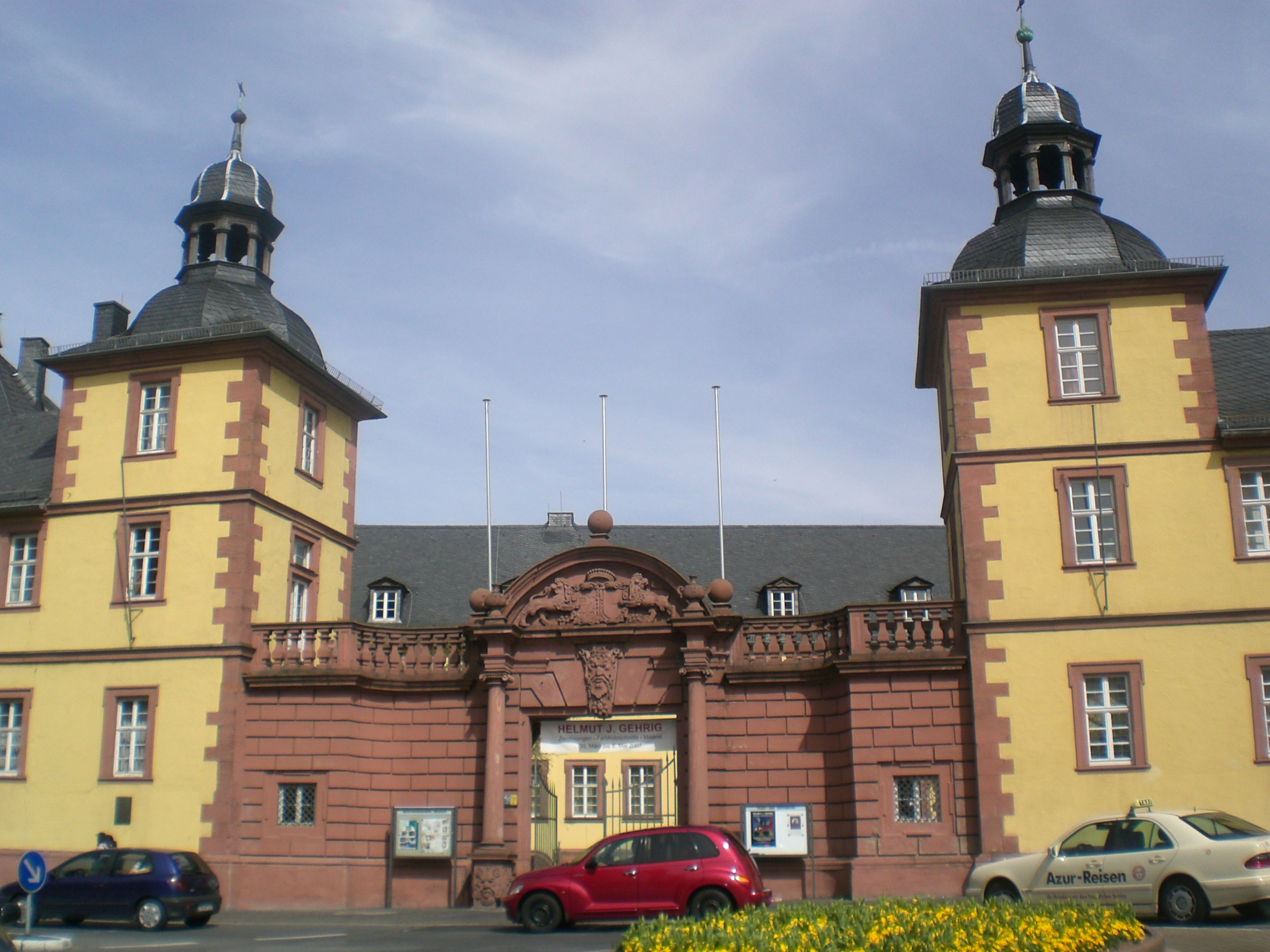
Schönborner Hof

The Natural History Museum of Aschaffenburg (German: Naturwissenschaftliches Museum Aschaffenburg) is a natural history museum located in the historical Schönborner Hof in Aschaffenburg, Bavaria, Germany.

Since 1970 the museum has been housed in the former city palace of the Counts of Schönborn (built 1681), and currently contains a mineral collection, extensive butterfly collection, taxidermic collection of regional fauna, and herbarium (established 1900).

== See also ==
- List of botanical gardens in Germany
