= Botanischer Garten der Universität Osnabrück =

Coordinates: 52.2816°N 8.0279°E

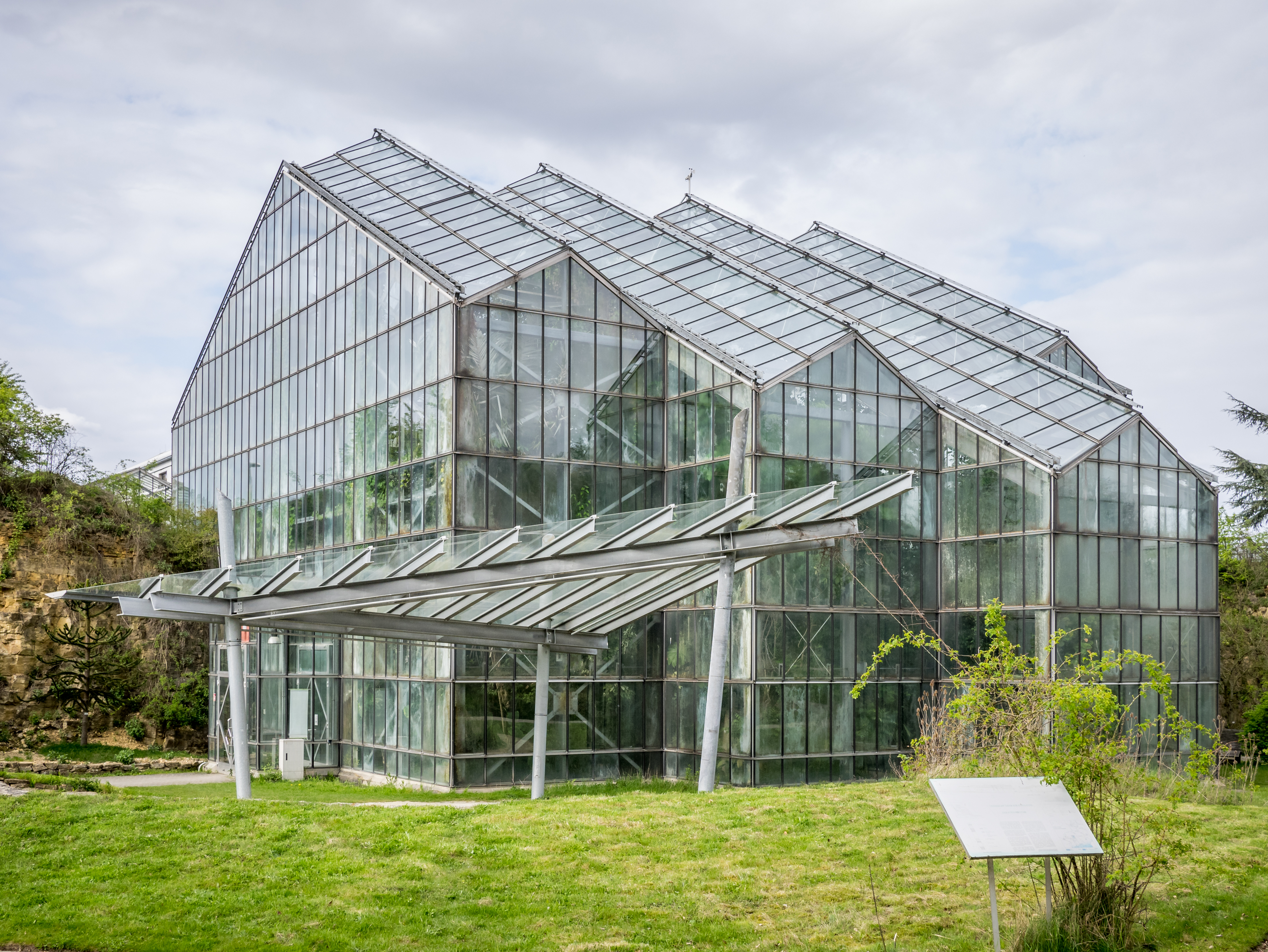
The Tropical Glasshouse, Botanic Garden of Osnabrück

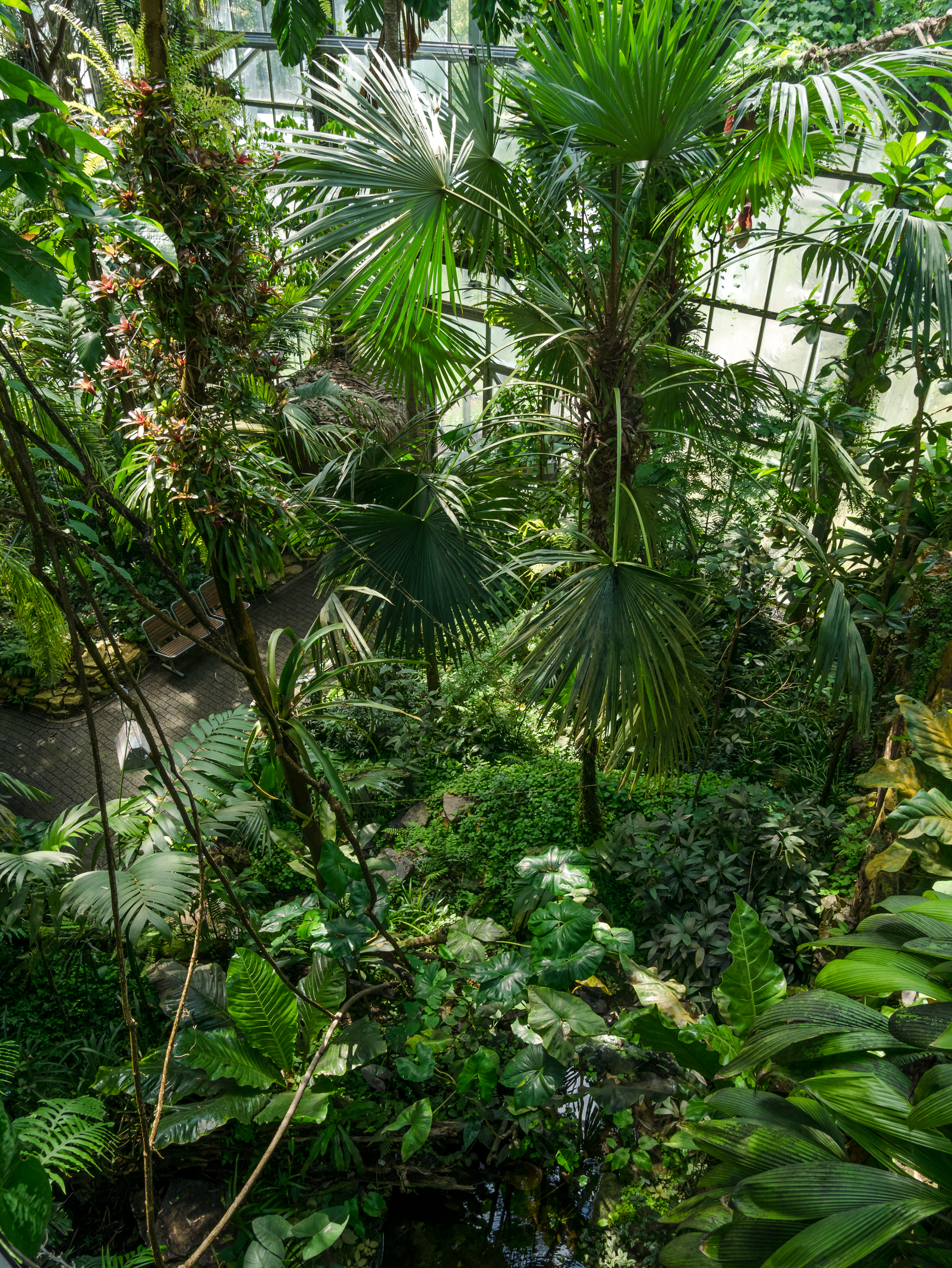
Lush foliage of palms, aroids, bromeliads and other tropical plants in the Tropical Glasshouse

The Botanic Garden of Osnabrück is an institution of Osnabrück University. It is located in the Westerberg area of the city in a former Muschelkalk quarry, Muschelkalk (“mussel-chalk”) being a shell-bearing limestone of Triassic age typical of Central and Western Europe (although absent from the United Kingdom). The Botanic Garden is part of the University’s Faculty of Biology and Chemistry and was established in 1984. Main tasks of the Garden are education and research, as well as public relations.

== Description ==
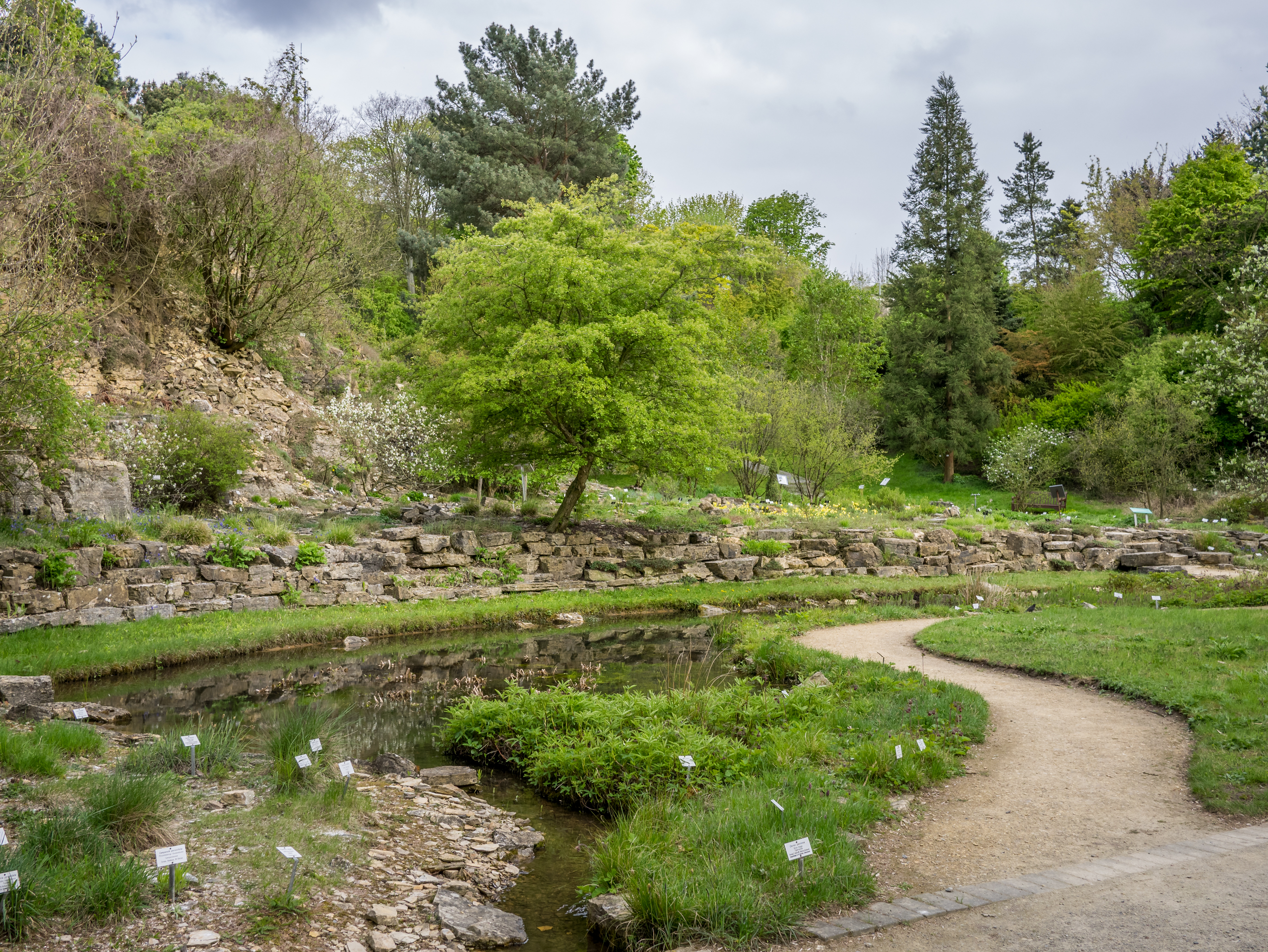
Section of the Botanic Garden devoted to the calcicole flora of the Swabian Jura, a range of limestone hills in southwestern Germany

It comprises an area of 8.4 ha, subdivided between two quarries. One quarry of 5.6 ha houses the outdoor display gardens as well as the glasshouse. The second quarry of 2.8 ha is a conservation area and home to rare plant associations typical to recently abandoned limestone quarries. The garden’s outdoor display areas show different plant communities from all over the world such as Mediterranean and alpine plants, or North American and Eurasian forests. There are also thematic collections of medical and aromatic plants and plant families (e.g. the garlic family or the heath family). In the Lowland Rainforest House more than 800 species of tropical plants provide an example for the vegetation of the Amazon basin.

== Research ==
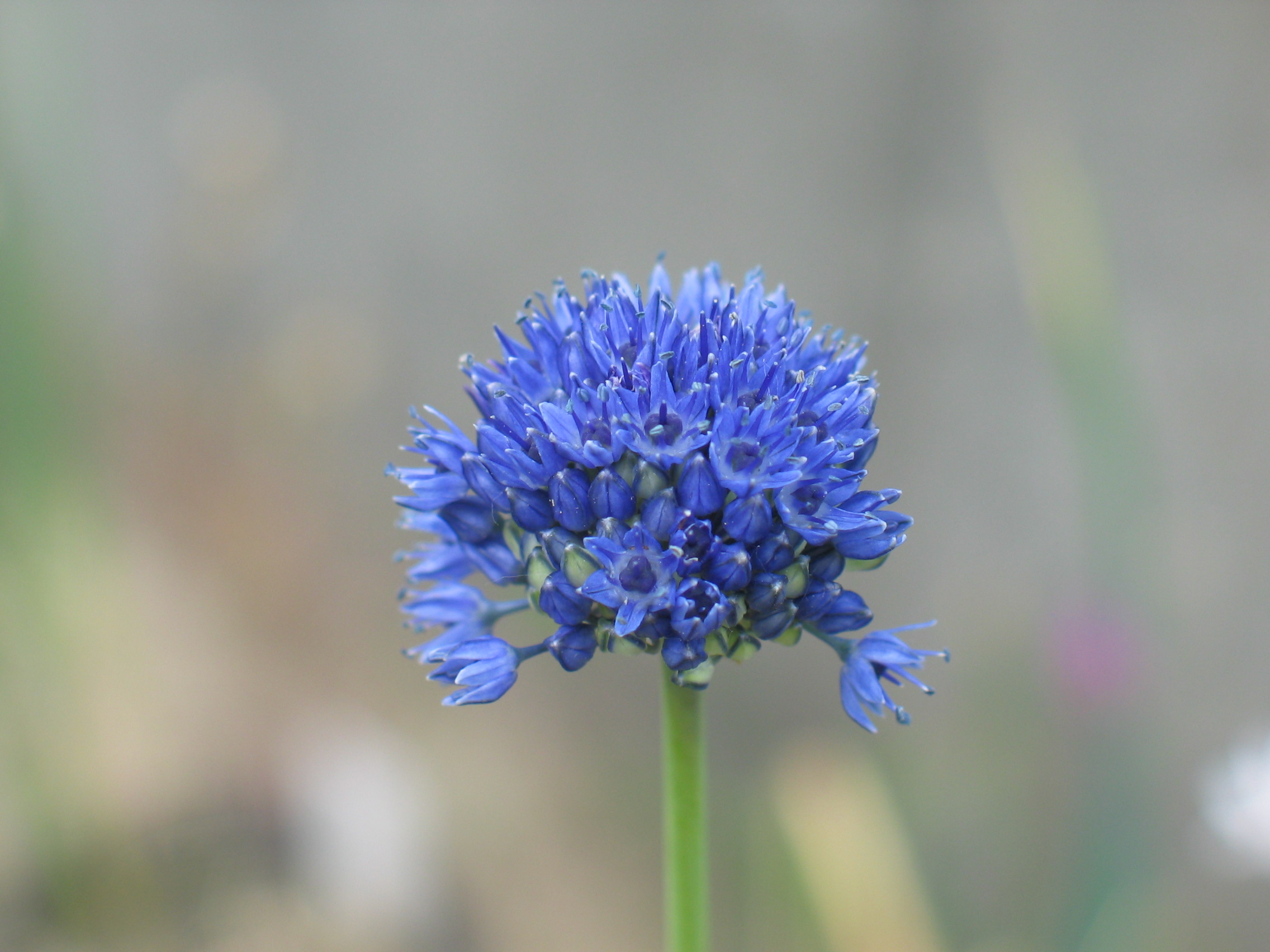
Allium caeruleum, an attractive species from Central Asia, flowering in the Botanic Garden’s celebrated Allium zone

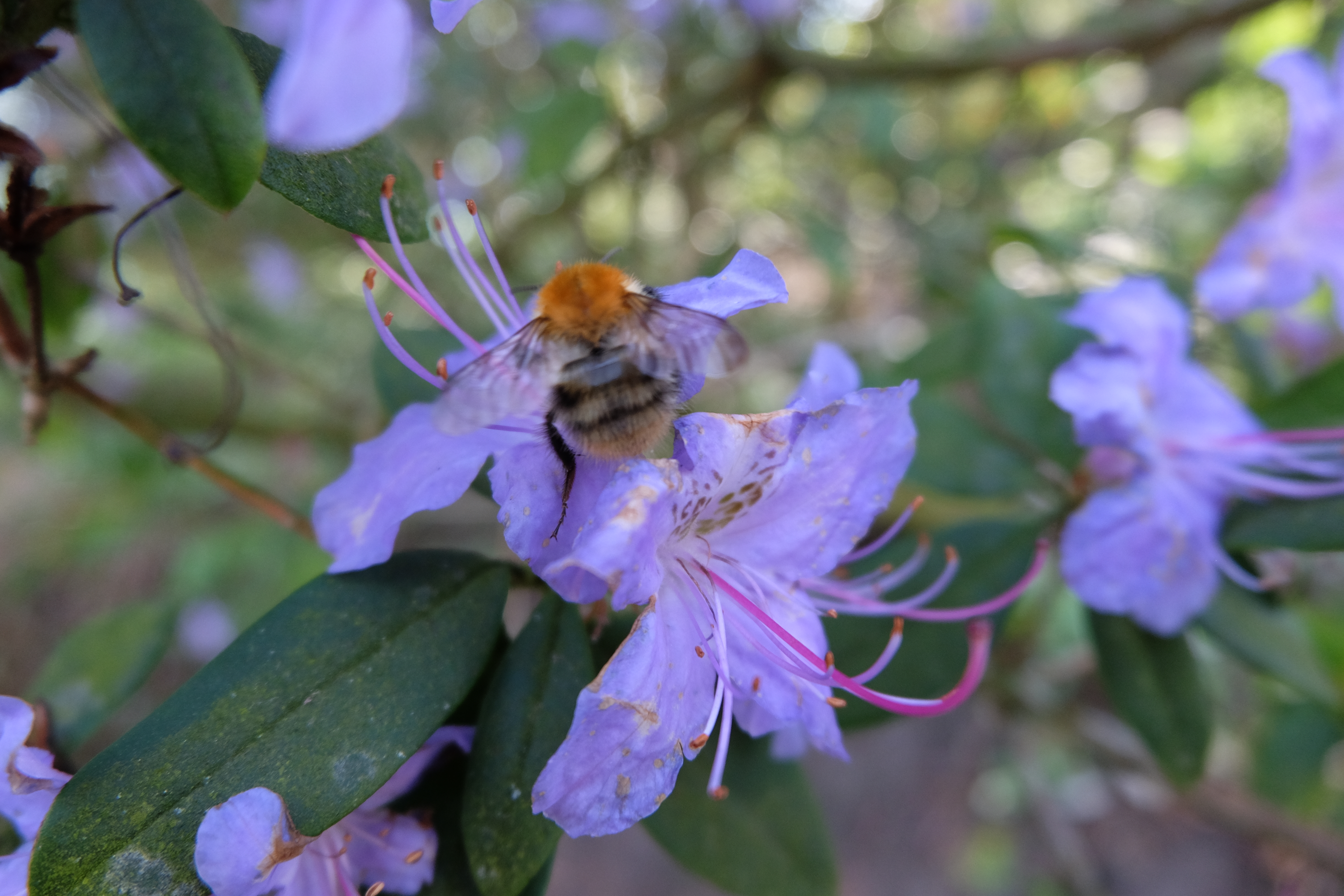
Bumblebee pollinating Rhododendron flower in woodland area with acid soil

Research in the Botanic Garden of Osnabrück focuses on biodiversity and the evolution of land plants. Special interest lies in the phylogeny of the genus Allium, to which belong such well-known vegetables as garlic, onions, chives, leeks and shallots. The Allium collection of the Botanic Garden comprises no fewer than 230 species. Different departments, especially the Departments of Botany and Ecology, use the Botanic Garden for outdoor testing. The Botanic Garden of Osnabrück houses the Loki Schmidt-Genbank, a seed bank for wild plant conservation founded in 2003. The Garden also coordinates the WEL-Genbank (Genbank Wildpflanzen für Ernährung und Landwirtschaft). This seed bank, focusing on the conservation of the wild relatives of economically used plants, is under construction in cooperation with the Botanic Gardens of Berlin-Dahlem, Regensburg and Karlsruhe as well as the University of Education Karlsruhe.

== Education ==
The collections of the Botanic Gardens are used intensively in biological education at both school and university level. Many biologists working on Bachelor-, Master-, Diplom- and Ph.D. theses collaborate with the Botanic Garden.

== Public Relations ==
The Botanic Garden of Osnabrück attracts approximately 70,000 visitors a year. Entry is free. There are guided tours of the Garden on a regular basis, the so-called “Sonntagsspaziergänge”. The “Grüne Schule” offering these Sunday tours also provides a range of different thematic and seasonal tours which can be booked by interested groups. The offers and services of the “Grüne Schule” are especially aimed at children and groups of pupils, but there are also a variety of tours for adults. In 2010 400 guided tours of the Garden took place. Since 2011 there has also been a self-guided tour available which is based on GPS Points of Interest. The Botanic Garden and its public relations are strongly supported by the 300-or-so Friends of the Garden, who make up the “Freundeskreis des Botanischen Gartens der Universität Osnabrück e.V.”.

== See also ==
- List of botanical gardens in Germany
