= Botanischer Garten der Universität des Saarlandes =

Former botanical garden in Germany

Coordinates: 49.2545°N 7.0378°E

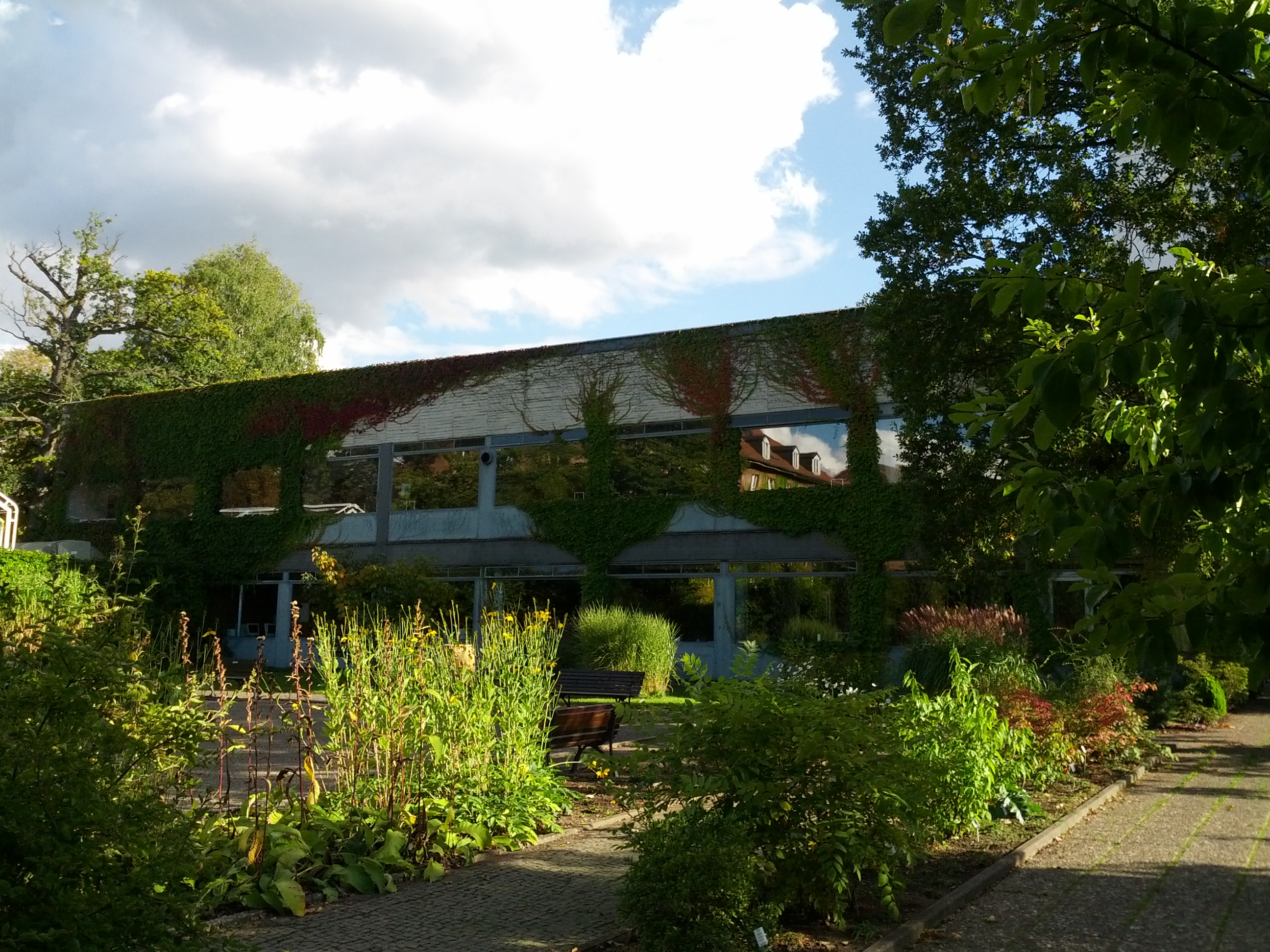
Botanischer Garten der Universität des Saarlandes

The Botanischer Garten der Universität des Saarlandes was a 2.5-hectare-large (6.2-acre) botanical garden maintained by Saarland University. It was located on the university campus in Saarbrücken, Saarland, Germany.

The garden was founded in 1952 and contained about 2500 plant species, varieties, and hybrids. It contained greenhouses as well as a medicinal plant museum of some 2500 accessions representing approximately 1000 taxa that illustrate the basic principles of various healing systems from around the world, including the traditional Indian system (Ayurveda), Chinese medicine, and African and Native American medicine and homeopathy. As of April 1, 2016 the garden had closed.

== See also ==
- List of botanical gardens in Germany
