= List of botanical gardens in Germany =

This is a list of botanical gardens in Germany. This list is intended to contain all significant botanical gardens and arboreta in Germany.

== List ==
Name	Location	Comments	Picture
Botanischer Garten Aachen	Aachen		
Botanischer Garten Adorf	Adorf/Vogtl.		
Botanischer Garten Schellerhau	Altenberg		
Botanischer Erlebnisgarten Altenburg	Altenburg		
Natural History Museum, Aschaffenburg	Aschaffenburg		
Botanischer Garten Augsburg	Augsburg		
Kurpark Bad Bellingen	Bad Bellingen		
WeltWald Harz	Bad Grund		
Botanischer Garten in Bad Langensalza	Bad Langensalza		
Pflanzengarten Bad Schandau	Bad Schandau		
Lichtentaler Allee	Baden-Baden		
Staatliche Baderverwaltung Badenweiler	Badenweiler		
Ökologisch-Botanischer Garten der Universität Bayreuth	Bayreuth		
Botanical Garden in Berlin	Berlin		
Späth-Arboretum	Berlin		
Botanischer Garten Bielefeld	Bielefeld		
Botanischer Garten der Ruhr-Universität Bochum	Bochum	Founded in 1968.	
Arboretum Park Härle	Bonn		
Botanische Gärten der Friedrich-Wilhelms-Universität Bonn	Bonn		
Botanischer Garten der Technischen Universität Braunschweig	Braunschweig		
Rhododendron-Park Bremen	Bremen		
Botanischer Garten Chemnitz	Chemnitz		
Arktisch-Alpiner Garten der Walter-Meusel-Stiftung	Chemnitz		
Botanischer Garten der TU Darmstadt	Darmstadt		
Botanischer Garten Rombergpark	Dortmund	With 68 hectares the largest botanical garden in Germany.	
Botanischer Garten der Technischen Universität Dresden	Dresden		
Botanischer Garten Duisburg-Hamborn	Duisburg		
Botanischer Garten Kaiserberg	Duisburg		
Botanischer Garten Düsseldorf	Düsseldorf		
Forstbotanischer Garten Eberswalde	Eberswalde		
Hortus Eystettensis	Eichstätt		
Arboretum Ellerhoop-Thiensen	Ellerhoop		
Botanischer Garten Erlangen	Erlangen		
Arboretum Main-Taunus	Eschborn		
Botanischer Garten Grugapark	Essen		
Botanischer Garten der Universität Duisburg-Essen	Essen		
Palmengarten	Frankfurt am Main		
Botanischer Garten der Johann Wolfgang Goethe-Universität Frankfurt am Main	Frankfurt am Main		
Arboretum Freiburg-Günterstal	Freiburg im Breisgau		
Freiburg Botanic Garden	Freiburg im Breisgau		
Sichtungsgarten Weihenstephan	Freising		
Alpengarten auf dem Schachen	Garmisch-Partenkirchen		
Botanischer Garten Gera	Gera		
Akademischer Forstgarten Gießen	Gießen		
Botanischer Garten Gießen	Gießen		
Alter Botanischer Garten der Universität Göttingen	Göttingen		
Neuer Botanischer Garten der Universität Göttingen	Göttingen		
Forstbotanischer Garten und Pflanzengeographisches Arboretum der Universität Göttingen	Göttingen		
Forstlicher Versuchsgarten Grafrath	Grafrath		
Greifswald Botanic Garden	Greifswald		
Botanischer Garten für Arznei- und Gewürzpflanzen Oberholz	Großpösna		
Stadtpark und Botanischer Garten Gütersloh	Gütersloh		
Botanische Garten der Martin-Luther-Universität Halle-Wittenberg	Halle, Saxony-Anhalt		
Alter Botanischer Garten Hamburg	Hamburg		
Arboretum Lohbrügge	Hamburg		
Botanischer Garten Hamburg (Biozentrum Klein Flottbek und Botanischer Garten)	Hamburg		
Botanischer Sondergarten Wandsbek	Hamburg		
Herrenhäuser Gärten Hannover	Hannover		
Botanischer Schulgarten Burg	Hannover		
Heil- und Giftpflanzengarten der Tierärztlichen Hochschule Hannover	Hannover		
Forstbotanischer Garten in Hannoversch Münden	Hannoversch Münden		
Botanischer Garten der Universität Heidelberg	Heidelberg		
Botanischer Garten der Stadt Hof	Hof		
Botanischer Garten des Deutschen Medizinhistorischen Museums	Ingolstadt		
Botanischer Garten Jena	Jena		
Botanischer Garten am Karlsruher Institut für Technologie	Karlsruhe		
Botanischer Garten Karlsruhe	Karlsruhe		
Botanischer Garten Kassel	Kassel		
Gewächshaus für tropische Nutzpflanzen	Kassel		
Alter Botanischer Garten Kiel	Kiel		
Botanischer Garten der Christian-Albrechts-Universität zu Kiel	Kiel		
Flora und Botanischer Garten Köln	Köln		
Forstbotanischer Garten Köln	Köln		
Botanischer Garten der Universität Konstanz	Konstanz		
Botanischer Garten Krefeld	Krefeld		
Botanischer Garten der Universität Leipzig	Leipzig		
Botanischer Garten für Arznei- und Gewürzpflanzen Oberholz			
Arboretum Lehmkuhlen	Lehmkuhlen		
Arktisch-Alpiner Pflanzengarten und Alpine Staudengärtnerei	Leisnig		
Gruson-Gewächshäuser	Magdeburg		
Blumeninsel Mainau	Mainau		
Botanischer Garten der Johannes Gutenberg-Universität Mainz	Mainz		
Stadtpark Mannheim	Mannheim		
Alter Botanischer Garten Marburg	Marburg		
Neuer Botanischer Garten Marburg	Marburg		
Bunter Garten	Mönchengladbach		
Botanischer Garten Verein "Hochschulstandort Mühlhausen"	Mühlhausen		
Botanischer Garten München-Nymphenburg	München		
Botanische Staatssammlung München	München		
Botanischer Garten Münster	Münster (Westfalen)		
Sequoiafarm Kaldenkirchen	Nettetal		
Botanischer Garten der Nationalpark Bayerischer Wald	Neuschönau		
Botanischer Garten der Stadt Neuss	Neuss		
Rennsteiggarten Oberhof	Oberhof		
Botanischer Garten der Carl von Ossietzky-Universität Oldenburg	Oldenburg		
Botanischer Garten der Universität Osnabrück	Osnabrück		
Alpengarten Pforzheim	Pforzheim		
Botanischer Garten Potsdam	Potsdam		
Biosphäre Potsdam	Potsdam		
Botanischer Garten der Universität Regensburg	Regensburg		
Herzogspark	Regensburg		
Botanischer Garten Universität Rostock	Rostock		
Botanischer Garten der Universität des Saarlandes	Saarbrücken	closed down	
Rosarium Sangerhausen	Sangerhausen		
Botanischer Garten Solingen	Solingen		
Arboretum Habichtsborn	Staufenberg		
Wilhelma	Stuttgart		
Hohenheim Gardens	Stuttgart		
Lehmann-Garten	Templin		
Forstbotanischer Garten Tharandt	Tharandt		
Alter Botanischer Garten Tübingen	Tübingen		
Botanischer Garten der Universität Tübingen	Tübingen		
Botanischer Garten der Universität Ulm	Ulm		
Usedoms Botanischer Garten Mellenthin	Usedom		
Exotenwald Weinheim	Weinheim		
Schau- und Sichtungsgarten Hermannshof			
Brockengarten	Wernigerode		
Botanischer Garten der Stadt Wilhelmshaven	Wilhelmshaven		
Gewächshaus für tropische Nutzpflanzen	Witzenhausen		
Dessau-Wörlitz Garden Realm	Wörlitz		
Arboretum Burgholz	Wuppertal		
Botanischer Garten Wuppertal	Wuppertal		
Botanischer Garten der Universität Würzburg	Würzburg		

== See also ==
- List of botanical gardens
