= Botanischer Sondergarten Wandsbek =

Municipal botanical garden in Hamburg, Germany

Coordinates: 53.5824°N 10.0985°E

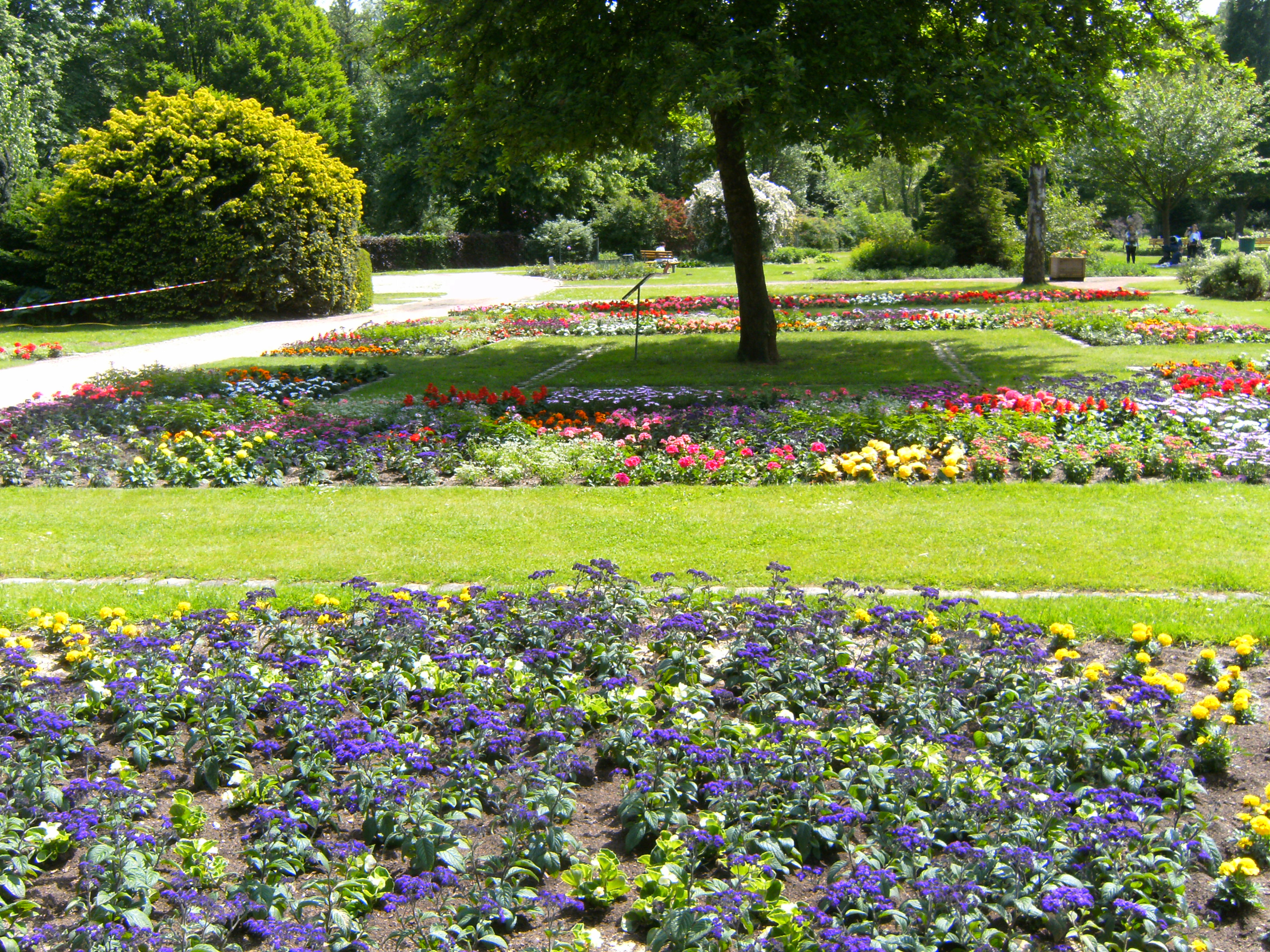
Hamburg, Germany, botanischer Sondergarten (special botanical garden) Wandsbek: planted flowers

The Botanischer Sondergarten Wandsbek (1.5 hectares) is a municipal botanical garden located in the Eichtalpark, Wandsbek, at Walddörferstraße 273, Hamburg, Germany. The garden began in 1926 as a school garden and became a municipal garden in 1956. It is open daily without charge.

== Position ==
The Botanical Garden is located in the Hamburg -Wandsbek district of the same name. It covers an area of almost 2 hectares, of which 1.5 hectares comprise the parkland, with the remainder consisting of buildings, greenhouses, and access roads. The garden lies between Walddörferstraße and Am Schulgarten streets, and the Wandse floodplain at the confluence of the Rahlau and Wandse rivers near Fischers Park.

== Local recreation area ==
[Wandsbek Botanical Garden: Flower and Insect House] Today, the special garden primarily serves as a place for recreation and relaxation, as well as for educating visitors about the plants cultivated and displayed. On average, 500 people visit each day. Armchairs and benches invite visitors to linger.

== See also ==
- List of botanical gardens in Germany
