= Botanischer Garten in Bad Langensalza =

Garden in Germany

Coordinates: 51.113889°N 10.648611°E

The Botanischer Garten in Bad Langensalza is a botanical garden located at Kurpromenade 5b, Bad Langensalza, Thuringia, Germany. The garden opened in 2002, and now contains an alpine garden, wet meadow, medicinal and aromatic garden, and succulent collections (agaves, cacti, yuccas), with notable specimens of Agave americana and Dioscorea elephantipes. It is open daily in the warmer months; admission is free.

== See also ==
- List of botanical gardens in Germany
