= Botanical garden of Düsseldorf =

Botanical garden in North Rhine-Westphalia, Germany

Coordinates: 51°11′13″N 6°48′09″E

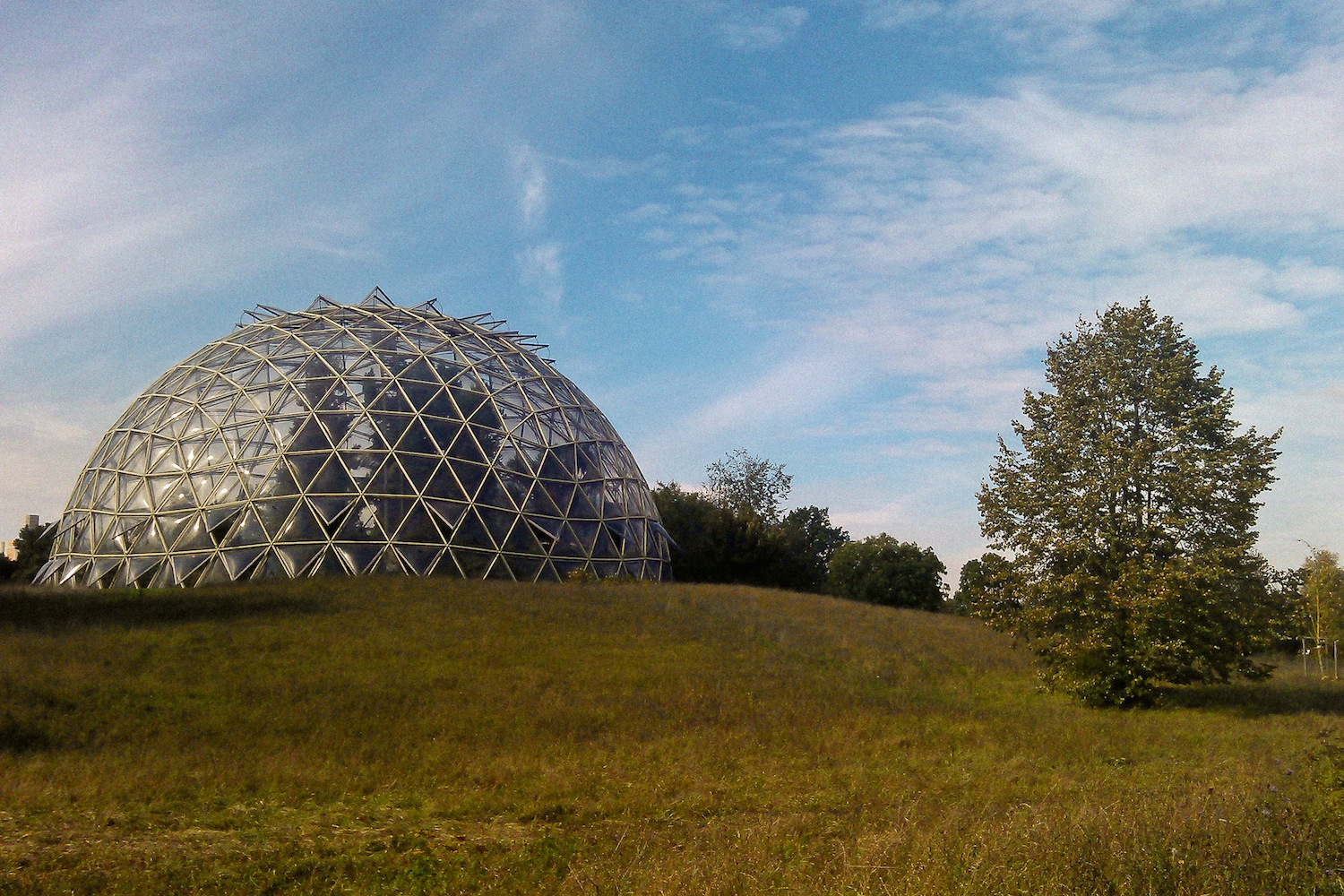
Botanischer Garten Düsseldorf

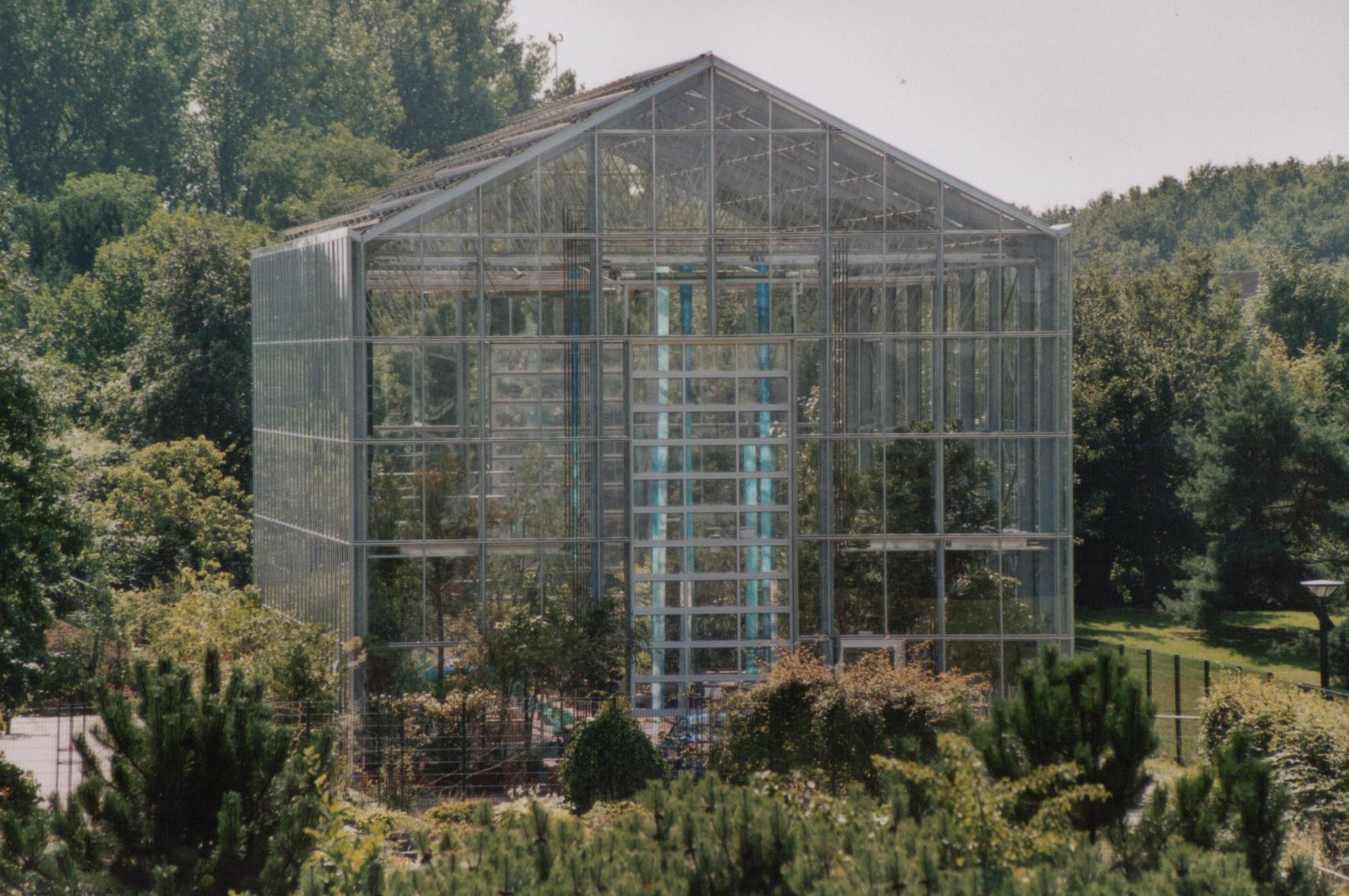
Orangery

The Botanischer Garten Düsseldorf, also known as the Botanischer Garten der Heinrich-Heine-Universität Düsseldorf and the Botanischer Garten der Universität Düsseldorf, is a botanical garden of 8 hectares maintained by the University of Düsseldorf. It is located at Universitätsstraße 1, Düsseldorf, North Rhine-Westphalia, Germany, and open daily in the warmer months; admission is free.

The garden was established in 1974 and currently contains about 6000 species, with a focus on plants of temperate climates. Its outdoor gardens are organized as follows:

- Geographic gardens - alpine garden, Central Europe, Caucasus, Northeast Asia, Japan, China, North America, and South America.
- Ecological gardens - heath, moor, pine forest, fruit trees, and wild flowers.
- Other gardens - systematic garden, medicinal garden, crops, cottage garden, conifers, summer flowers, plants of volcanic soils, morphology, endangered species, and carnivorous plants.

The garden also contains a greenhouse complex including:

- Central dome (approximately 1000 m^{2}, height 18 meters) - about 400 species from the Mediterranean region and Canary Islands, and also from Australia, New Zealand, Asia, South Africa, Chile, and California.
- Orangery (opened 2004, 300 m^{2}, height 13 meters) - overwintering of plants from Mediterranean regions, conifers from the Southern Hemisphere, and Pyrophytes from Australia and South Africa.
- South Africa house (opened 2008, 330 m^{2}) - South African steppe vegetation.

== See also ==
- List of botanical gardens in Germany
