= Botanischer Garten Aachen =

Botanical garden in Germany

Coordinates: 50.7789°N 6.0458°E

The Botanischer Garten Aachen (1.2 hectares) is a botanical garden maintained by RWTH Aachen. It is variously known as the Botanische Garten der RWTH Aachen, more formally the Botanische Garten der Rheinisch-Westfälische Technische Hochschule Aachen, and sometimes the Freundeskreis Botanischer Garten or Biologischen Zentrums Aachen BIOZAC für Ökologie und Umweltpädagogik. It was originally located at Melatener Straße 30, Aachen, North Rhine-Westphalia, Germany, with a new addition (the Karl Garten) located on Rabentalweg. Both are open daily without charge.

The gardens contain over 5,000 plant species in areas including an arboretum, an alpine garden, marsh, and collections of ferns and heath plants. Its greenhouses (600 m²) contain succulents and a good collection of carnivorous plants. The Karl Garten is patterned upon the 70th chapter of Charlemagne's "de Capitular villis vel curtis imperialibus", which specifies over 90 plants to be grown in every royal garden.

The former Botanical Garden in the "Melatener Straße" is closed down. At its place you can find the university apiary now.

== See also ==
- List of botanical gardens in Germany
