= Botanischer Garten der Johannes Gutenberg-Universität Mainz =

Botanical garden in Germany

Coordinates: 49.991°N 8.241°E

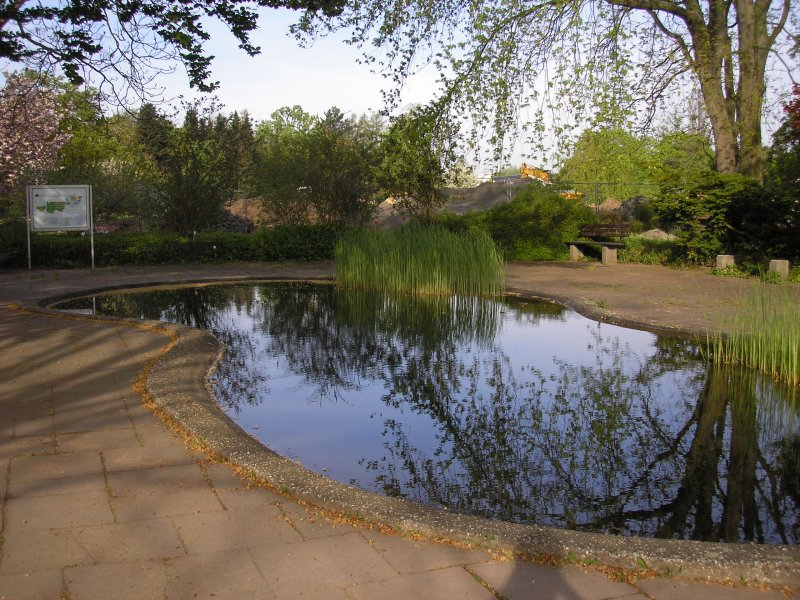
Botanischer Garten Mainz

The Botanischer Garten der Johannes Gutenberg-Universität Mainz (10 hectares), also known as the Botanischer Garten Mainz, is an arboretum and botanical garden maintained by the University of Mainz. It is located on the university campus at Franz von Bentzel-Weg 9, Mainz, Rhineland-Palatinate, Germany, and open daily.

The garden was created between 1946-1955 on land formerly used as farmland and a military training ground. Over 3500 individual plant beds were created in those years; in the mid-1950s an alpine garden was added, and in 1986 sections for steppe plants and Mainz regional flora were established. The first greenhouse was built in 1948 with two more added in 1952, which formed the basis for an extensive greenhouse complex.

Today the garden contains about 8,500 species. Its major sections include an arboretum (30,000 m^{2}), systematic garden, greenhouses, and alpine garden, with outdoor collections focusing on flowering plants and woody plants of the northern hemisphere temperate zone, and a greenhouse complex containing plants from Mediterranean climates and the Southern Hemisphere as well as tropical and subtropical crops.

== See also ==
- List of botanical gardens in Germany
- Mainz Sand Dunes
