= Leipzig Botanical Garden =

Botanical garden in Saxony, Germany

Coordinates: 51.3290°N 12.3916°E

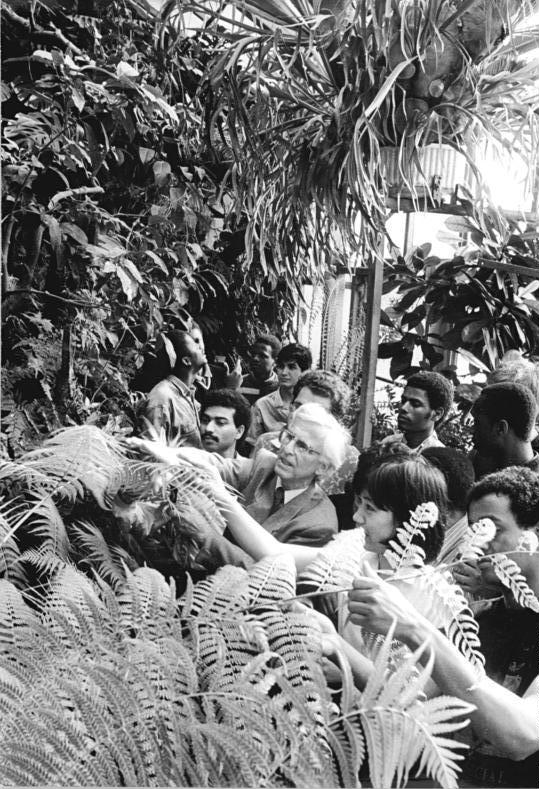
Leipzig Botanical Garden in 1989

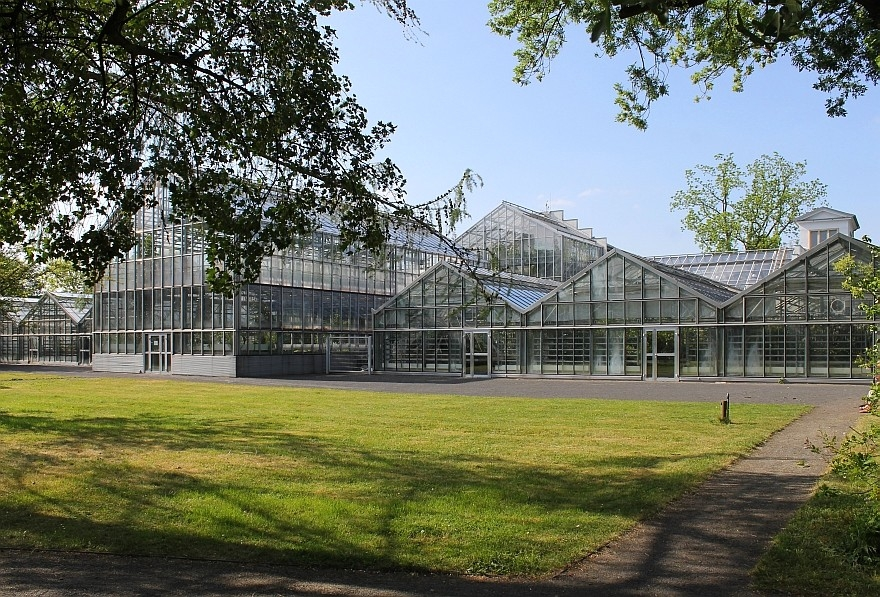
In 2015

The Leipzig Botanical Garden (German: Leipziger Botanische Gärten, Botanischer Garten der Universität Leipzig) is a 3.5-hectare botanical garden maintained by the University of Leipzig and is located at Linnéstraße 1, Leipzig, Saxony, Germany. It is the oldest botanical garden in Germany and among the oldest in the world, and open daily without charge.

Leipzig's botanical garden dates back to at least 1542, although the garden has moved several times. They were created shortly after the university's reform in 1539, when Maurice, Elector of Saxony donated the Dominican monastery of St. Pauli. Its former monastery garden, on the north side of the Paulinerkirche, was reworked as a hortus medicus by May 1543.

This first garden was destroyed in the Thirty Years' War, and in 1648 the university acquired a new site (now Grimmaische Strasse) where in 1653 it created its second garden. In 1807 the garden was moved to the grounds of the Pleißemühlgraben, where greenhouses were constructed after 1840. By 1857 the garden cultivated more than 10,000 species, of which 4,500 were grown in the greenhouses.

In 1876–1877, after the decision to erect a court house on its site, the garden was relocated once again to its present location southeast of Leipzig. The initial size of this new area (2.8 hectares) was extended in 1895, and the new greenhouses (1232 m^{2}) were more than twice as large as those at the previous site. The garden was utterly destroyed in World War II, with the ruins of the Botanical Institute subsequently demolished and backfilled with rubble. By 1954 the show houses had been restored, but economic difficulties in the 1980s led to closure of some greenhouses. After reunification, the garden was completely renovated (1992–2004), with a new butterfly house created in 1996 and five new greenhouses built in 1999–2000.

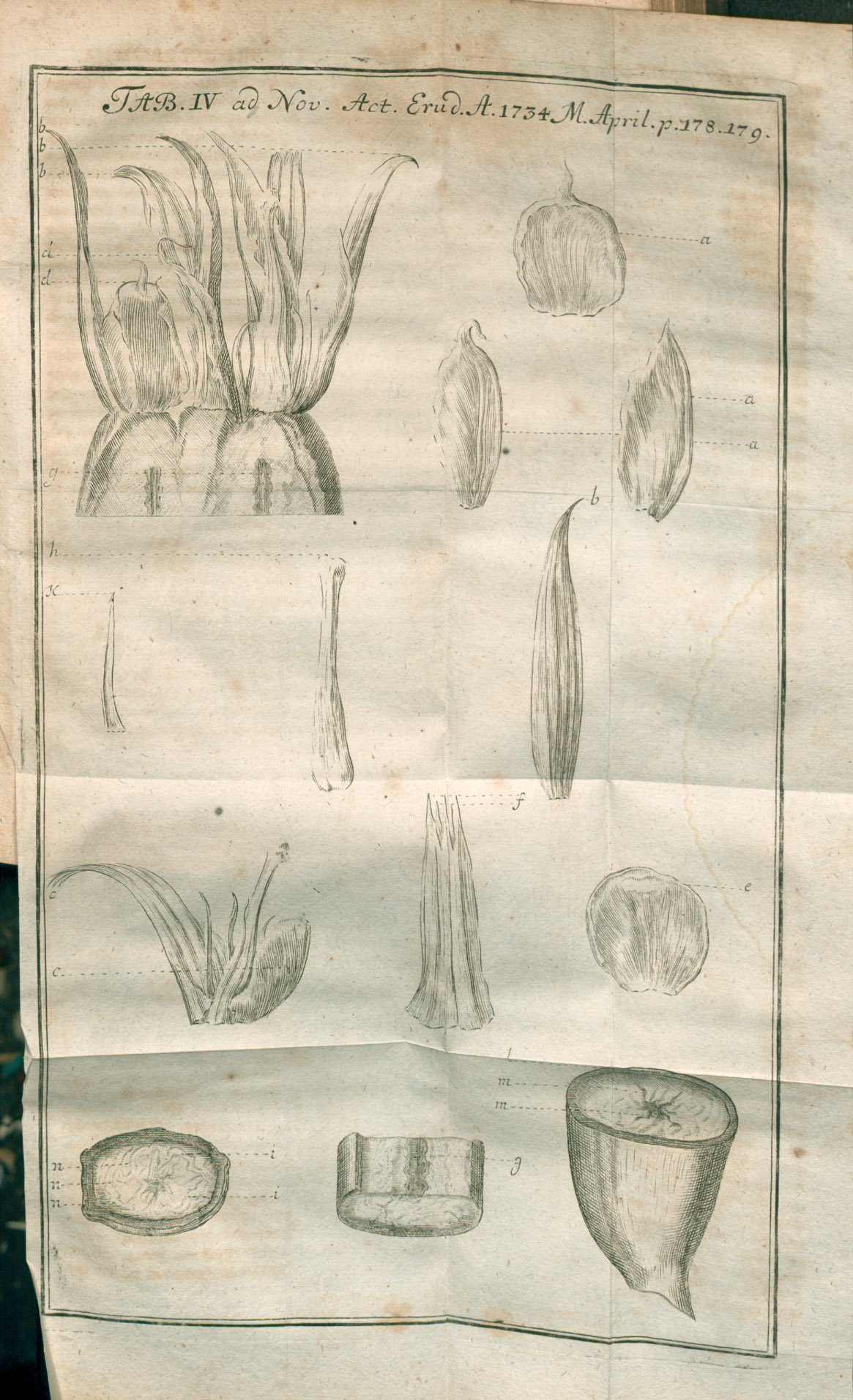
Illustration about vegetables of botanical garden from Acta Eruditorum, 1734

Today the garden contains a total of some 7,000 species, of which nearly 3,000 species comprise ten special collections. The garden contains a systematic department, as well as geographic arrangements of plants from the steppes of Eastern Europe and Asia, forests of the Northern Hemisphere, prairies, and eastern North America, as well as a marsh and pond with regional flora and an alpine garden containing plants from Asia, Europe, and South America. Its greenhouses (2,400 m^{2} total area) contain plants from subtropical and tropical zones of the Mediterranean region, Africa, Central America, and Australia.

== See also ==
- List of botanical gardens in Germany
- Botanischer Garten für Arznei- und Gewürzpflanzen Oberholz
