= Gewächshaus für tropische Nutzpflanzen =

Botanical garden in Hesse, Germany

Coordinates: 51.3445°N 9.8605°E

- Interactive map of Gewächshaus für tropische Nutzpflanzen
- Type: Botanical garden (greenhouse complex)
- Location: Steinstraße 19, Witzenhausen, Hesse, Germany
- Operator: University of Kassel
- Open: Several afternoons per week
- Facilities: Seminar rooms (300 m², 1987); research area (150 m², 1995)

The Gewächshaus für tropische Nutzpflanzen is a botanical garden specializing in tropical crops, maintained by the University of Kassel. It is located in greenhouses at Steinstraße 19, Witzenhausen, Hesse, Germany, and open several afternoons per week.

The greenhouses were first established in 1902 to support the colonial School of Agriculture, Trade and Industry (founded 1898), and then consisted of a central palm house with adjacent tropical and cold houses. These houses were replaced in 1937 with larger facilities which were extensively damaged in World War II. Postwar reconstruction was slow and the greenhouses did not resume operation until 1957 under the auspices of the Deutschen Instituts für Tropische und Subtropische Landwirtschaft GmbH (DITSL). A modern greenhouse of 1,200 square metres (13,000 ft^{2}) was built in 1965, with many improvements in 1971. Seminar rooms totaling 300 square metres (3,200 ft^{2}) and a research area of 150 square metres (1,600 ft^{2}) were added in 1987 and 1995 respectively.

Today the greenhouses proper are divided into five areas: a 10-metre (33 ft) high palm house of 240 square metres (2,600 ft^{2}) as well as a coffee house, cocoa house, field cultures room, and orangery, each with a floor area of 225 square metres (2,420 ft^{2}) and 5 metres (16 ft) high.

== See also ==
- List of botanical gardens in Germany
