= Botanischer Garten für Arznei- und Gewürzpflanzen Oberholz =

Botanical garden in Saxony, Germany

Coordinates: 51°15′25.9194″N 12°28′14.52″E

The Botanischer Garten für Arznei- und Gewürzpflanzen Oberholz (2 hectares), or less formally the Botanischer Garten Oberholz, is a botanical garden specializing in medical plants and spices. It is located at Störmthaler Weg 2 in Oberholz, a small suburb southeast of Großpösna, Leipzig, Saxony, Germany, and open daily in the warmer months; admission is free.

The garden was established in 1936 as an adjunct to Leipzig Botanical Garden to provide pharmacists with a practical knowledge of medicinal and aromatic plants. It was revived in 1945, after World War II, by the initiative of a vocational teacher, and from 1948-2003 was maintained by the city of Leipzig as a municipal botanical garden. Since 2003 it has been maintained by the Association for Vocational Promotion of Women in Saxony. Today the garden contains over 400 species, and is cultivated as a teaching and display garden.

== See also ==
- Leipzig Botanical Garden
- List of botanical gardens in Germany
