= Botanischer Garten Verein "Hochschulstandort Mühlhausen" =

Garden in Germany

The Botanischer Garten Verein "Hochschulstandort Mühlhausen" is, or was, a botanical garden maintained by the Hochschulstandort Mühlhausen teacher's training college, and located at Wanfrieder Straße 113 or Thälmannstraße 28, Mühlhausen, Thuringia, Germany. Although the garden is listed in BGCI and Webmuseen catalogs, among others, an article dated from 2001 ("Weiterbestand des Botanischen Gartens in Mühlhausen") implies its closure.

== See also ==
- List of botanical gardens in Germany
