= Gruson-Gewächshäuser =

Botanical garden in Saxony-Anhalt, Germany

Coordinates: 52°06′50″N 11°37′54″E

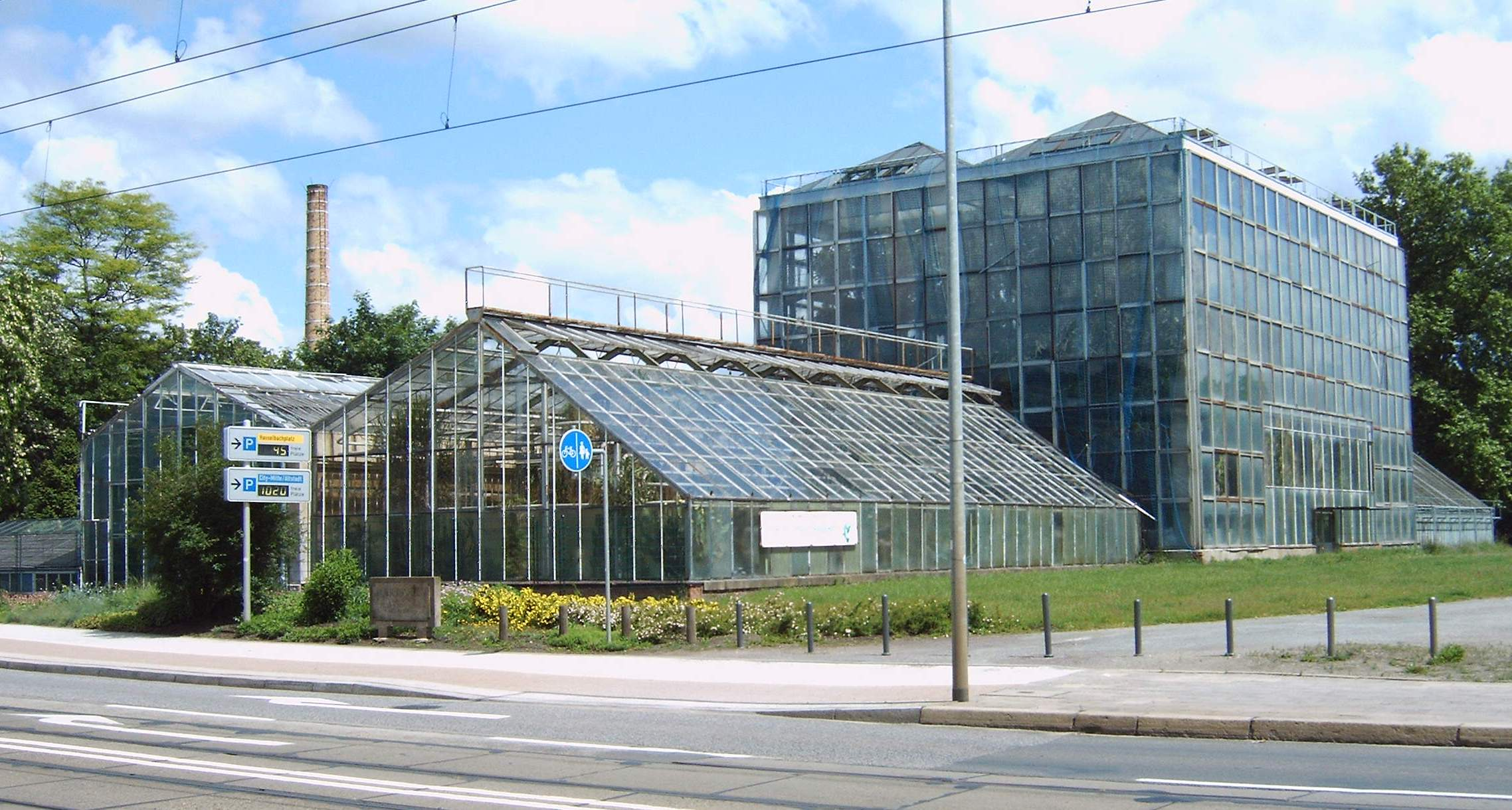
Gruson-Gewächshäuser

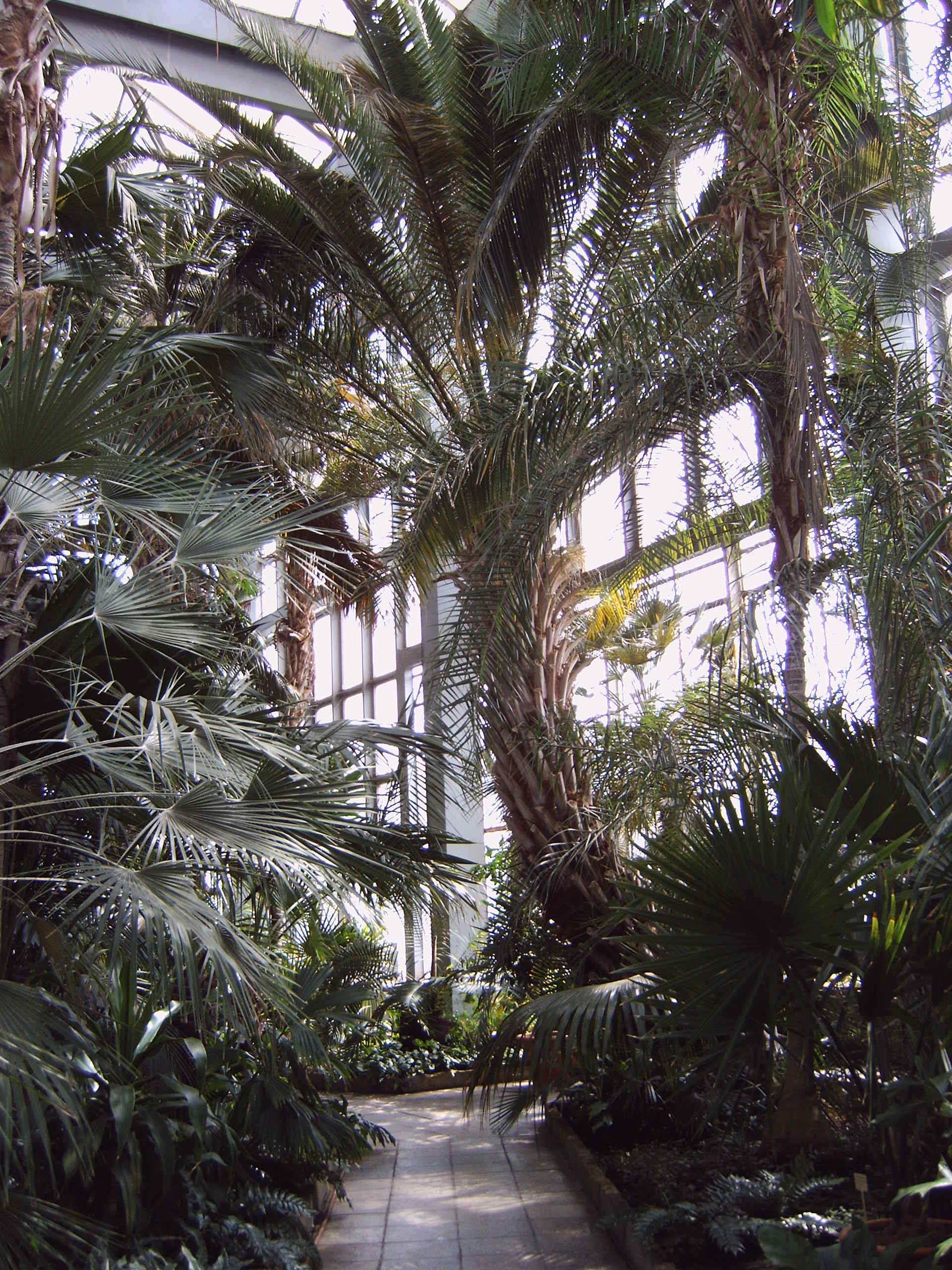
Palm house interior

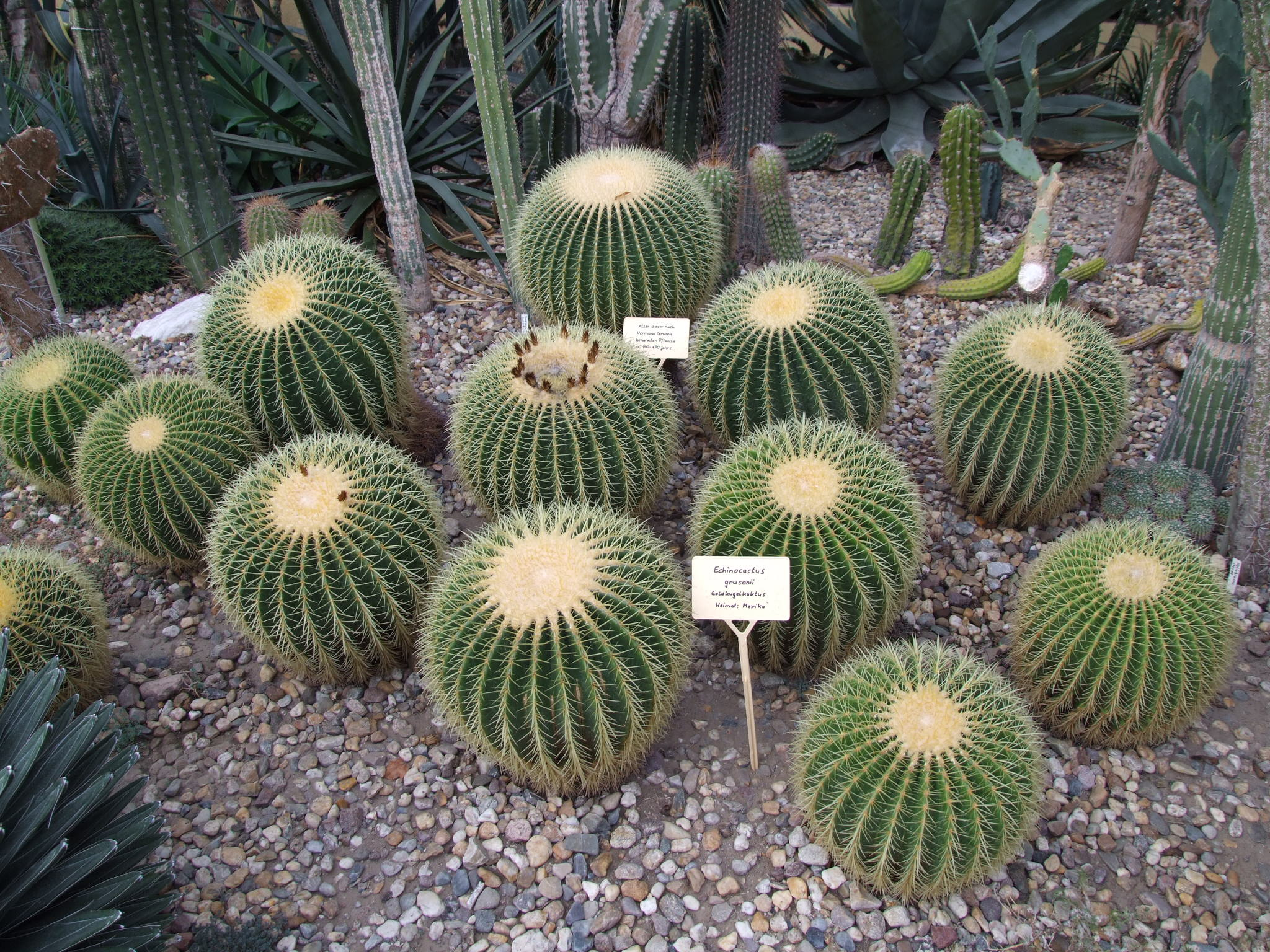
Echinocactus grusonii

The Gruson-Gewächshäuser, more formally known as the Gruson-Gewächshäuser Magdeburg Exotische Pflanzensammlung, is a botanical garden located in greenhouses at Schönebecker Strasse 129 b, Magdeburg, Saxony-Anhalt, Germany. They are open daily except Monday.

The garden was created by industrialist and plant collector Hermann Gruson, who upon his death in 1895 bequeathed his extensive succulent collection and 100,000 Marks to the city of Magdeburg. The greenhouses opened to the public in 1896, with a Victoria house added in 1910. The garden suffered severe damage in World War II, with virtually all glass broken, and the palm house completely destroyed. By the summer of 1945, however, its cactus and succulent house reopened, as did the tropical house. Other houses were gradually restored, with the palm house rebuilt in 1986.

Today the garden maintains 10 exhibition halls (4000 m^{2} area) which contain about 3000 plant species from approximately 350 genera. Major collections are as follows:

- Cactus house - 400 cactus species, including a 150-year-old golden ball cactus (Echinocactus grusonii) named in Gruson's honor.
- Tropical Houses - tropical plants including banana, cocoa, guava, pepper, pineapple, rubber trees, and sweet potatoes.
- Victoria house - Victoria amazonica, as well as lotus, mimosa, rice, and sugarcane.
- Palm House (16 meter height) - many palm species and giant bamboo.
- Grusonian greenhouses - 400 species of bromeliads, exotic birds, and a dwarf palm tree.
- Fern house - ferns, some of which are more than 130 years old, as well as cycads.
- Mediterranean house - plants from the Mediterranean region, including camellia, citrus plants, fruit trees, laurel, and myrtle.

An annex contains aquariums and terrariums. The largest aquarium represents a river landscape with typical fish of the river Elbe. Collections also include Nile crocodiles, turtles, and piranhas.

== Garden dreams ==
Klosterbergegarten on the Elbe and Gruson Greenhouses are part of the Saxony-Anhalt Garden Dreams project.

== See also ==
- List of botanical gardens in Germany
