= Botanischer Garten Krefeld =

Botanical garden in North Rhine-Westphalia, Germany

Coordinates: 51°19′57″N 6°36′11″E

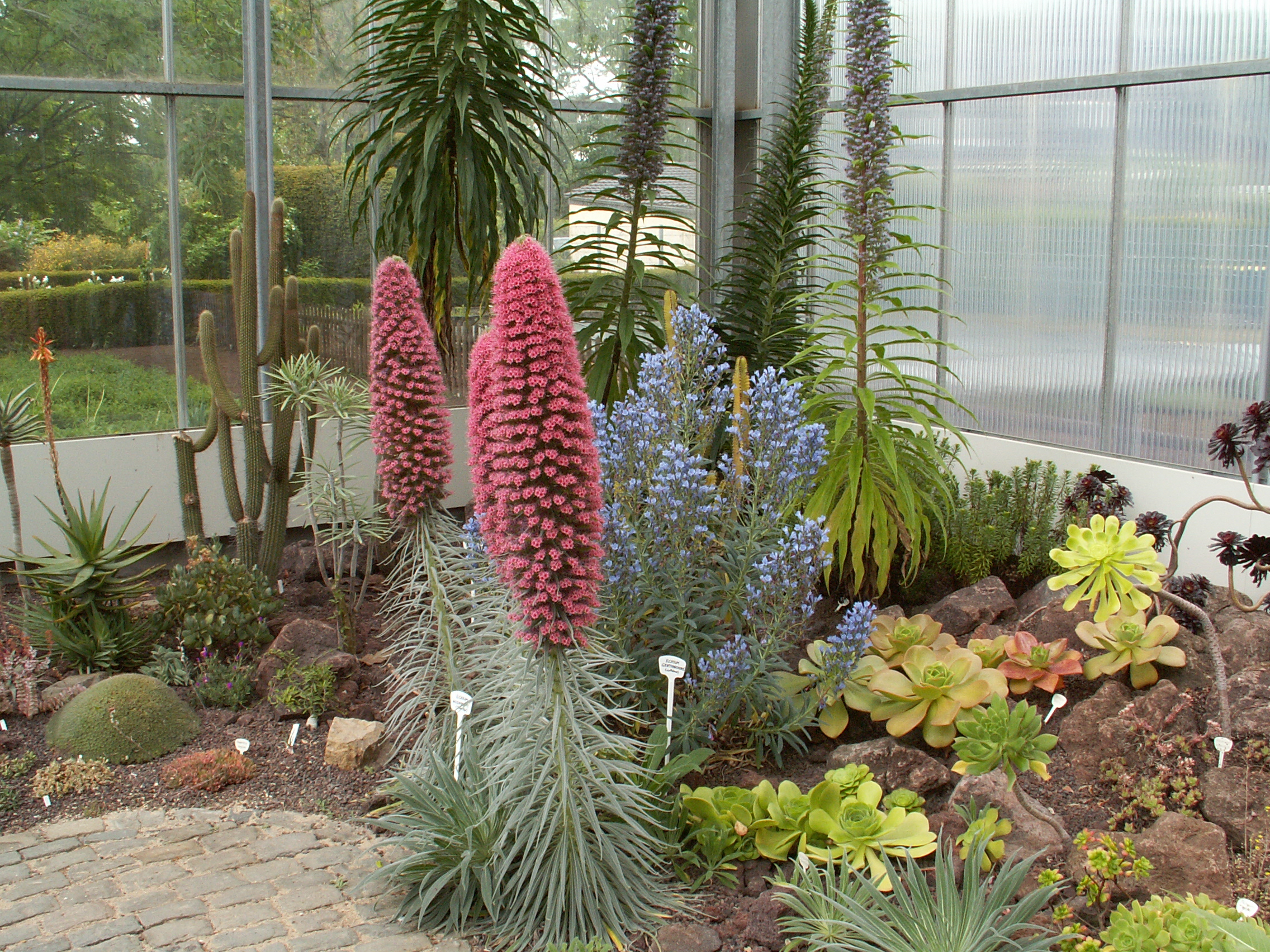
Greenhouse Botanischer Garten Krefeld

The Botanischer Garten Krefeld (3.6 hectares), more formally the Botanischer Garten der Stadt Krefeld, is a municipal botanical garden located at Sandberg 2, Krefeld, North Rhine-Westphalia, Germany. It is open daily in the warmer months; admission is free.

The garden was established in 1927–1928 as part of a small school. Today it contains about 5,000 species and varieties of plants in a plot edged with deciduous trees, shrubs, and conifers. Major garden features include a rose garden of some 3,000 specimens representing 150 rose varieties, an alpine garden, a medicinal herb garden, and a rhododendron area. Greenhouses contain cacti from South America and succulents from Africa, and other plants of the Canary Islands, carnivorous plants, and orchids.

== See also ==
- List of botanical gardens in Germany
