= Alpengarten Pforzheim =

Commercial nursery with botanical garden in Germany

Coordinates: 48.8621°N 8.7327°E

The Alpengarten Pforzheim is a commercial nursery with botanical garden specializing in alpine plants. It is located at Auf dem Berg 6, Pforzheim, Baden-Württemberg, Germany, and open weekdays in the warmer months; an admission fee is charged. The garden contains over 100,000 plants from all mountain areas of the world. Its main flowering period is from late April to mid-June when the Alpine roses and rhododendrons bloom.

== See also ==
- List of botanical gardens in Germany
