= Bunter Garten =

Municipal park with botanical garden in Germany

Coordinates: 51.2024°N 6.4329°E

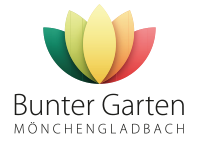
Logo

The Bunter Garten (30 hectares) is a municipal park with botanical garden (5 hectares) and arboretum located along Lettow-Vorbeck Straße, Mönchengladbach, North Rhine-Westphalia, Germany. It is open daily without charge.

The park contains three major sections: Kaiserpark, Colorful Garden, and Botanical Garden, including a rock garden, herb garden, and a fragrance garden, as well as the Kaiser-Friedrich-Halle and an aviary of some 200 birds. All told, the park contains about 4000 plant taxa, including 1400 species and varieties of deciduous trees and shrubs, and 800 types of conifers, including 150 types of maples, 60 types of oaks, and 20 types of birch. It also contains 600 species and varieties of rhododendrons and azaleas, and about 1200 types of perennials, as well as numerous artworks.

== See also ==
- List of botanical gardens in Germany
