= Botanischer Erlebnisgarten Altenburg =

Botanical garden in Thuringia, Germany

Coordinates: 50.9904°N 12.4311°E

The Botanischer Erlebnisgarten Altenburg (8000 m²) is a botanical garden located at Heinrich-Zille-Straße 12, Altenburg, Thuringia, Germany. It is open daily.

The garden was created between 1928 and 1930 by sewing machine manufacturer Karl K. Dietrich to designs by landscape gardener Hans Dippel. After World War II it came into municipal possession. It closed in 2003 due to financial difficulties, but was maintained and restored by a regional gardeners' association, and in 2006 re-opened to the public. Today the garden contains about 3,000 plants, including about 150 taxa of Erica, a further 150 taxa of roses, an alpine garden, summer flowers, and greenhouse (150 m²).

== See also ==
- List of botanical gardens in Germany
