= Botanischer Garten Gera =

Botanical garden in Germany

Coordinates: 50.8758°N 12.0878°E

- Botanischer Garten der Museum für Naturkunde Gera
- Interactive map of Botanischer Garten Gera
- Type: Botanical garden
- Location: Nicolaistrasse 6, Gera, Thuringia, Germany
- Area: 0.7 hectares (1.7 acres)
- Created: 1897–1900
- Operator: Museum für Naturkunde der Stadt Gera
- Open: Daily, free admission
- Species: ~300
- Collections: Trees, culinary herbs, medicinal plants

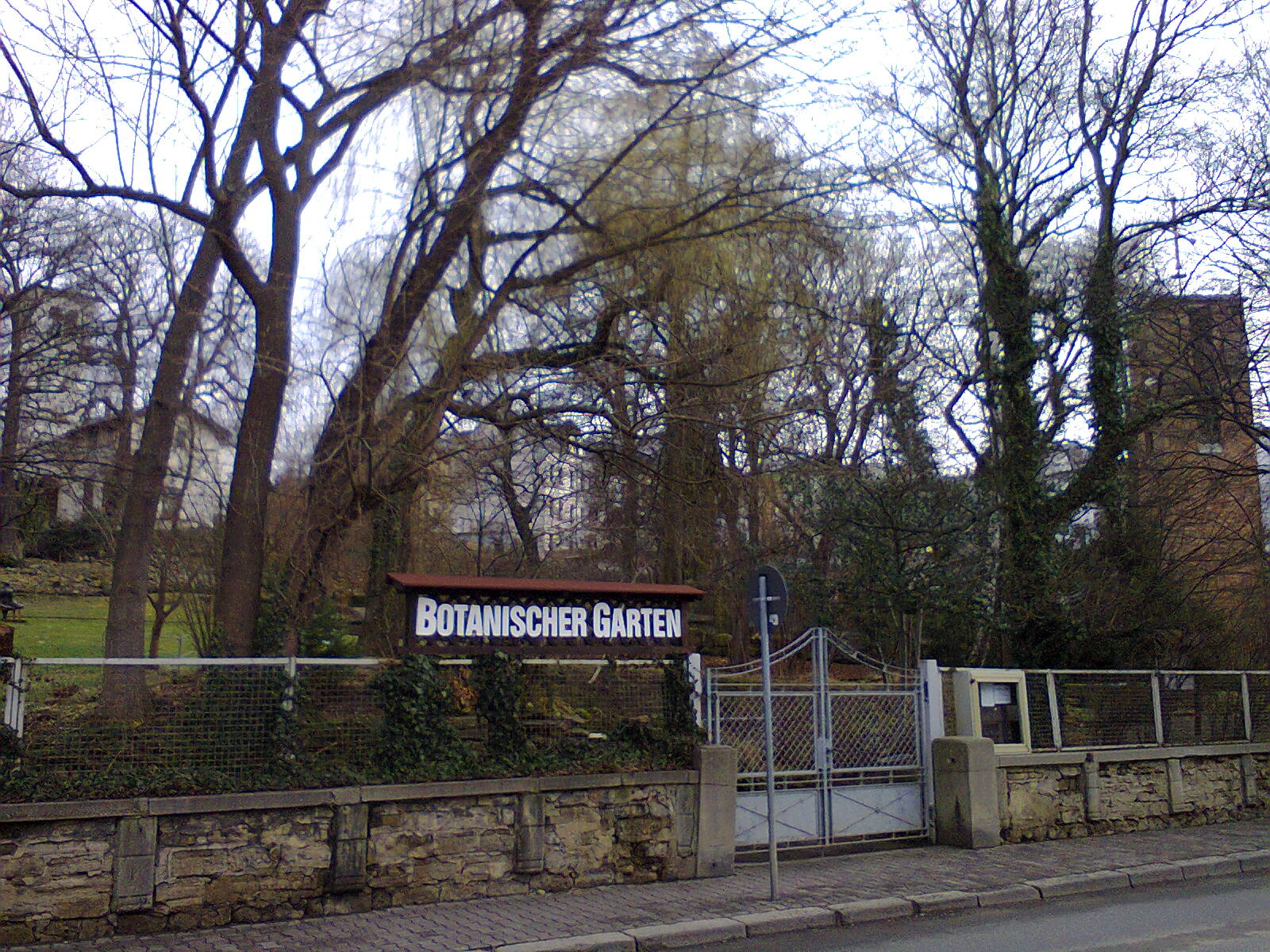
Central entrance to the garden

The Botanischer Garten Gera (0.7 hectares), also known as the Botanischer Garten der Museum für Naturkunde Gera, is a botanical garden located on the grounds of the Museum für Naturkunde der Stadt Gera at Nicolaistrasse 6, Gera, Thuringia, Germany. It is open daily without charge.

The garden was created from 1897 to 1900 in the English garden style, and is the last surviving garden in front of the eastern wall. It was linked to the municipal Museum of Natural History in 1947. Today it contains about 300 plant species, including trees, culinary herbs, and medical plants, as well as a tower house built in 1864.

== See also ==
- List of botanical gardens in Germany
