= Botanischer Garten der Stadt Wilhelmshaven =

Botanical garden in Lower Saxony, Germany

Coordinates: 53.5384°N 8.1247°E

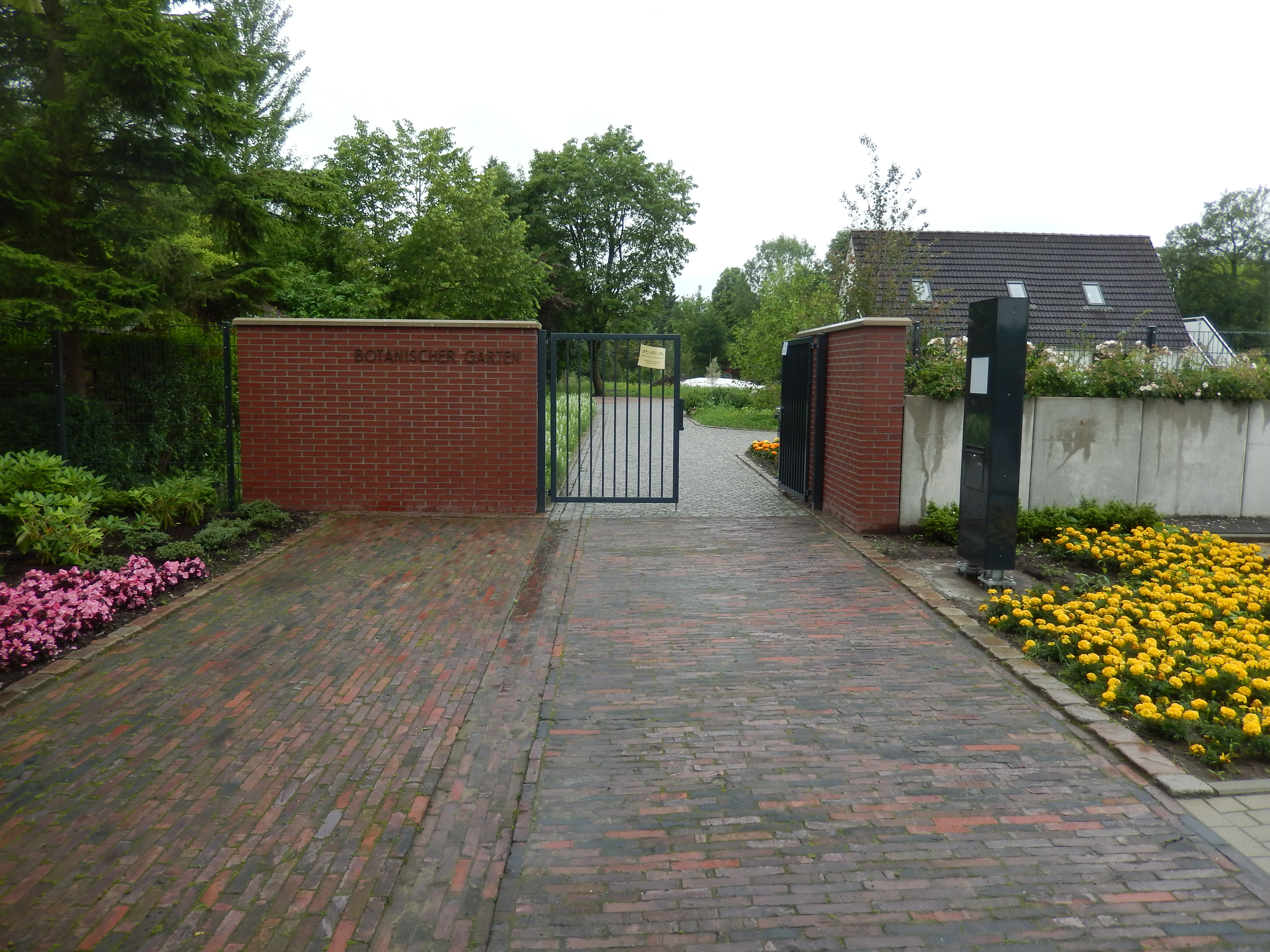
Entrance

The Botanischer Garten der Stadt Wilhelmshaven (6000 m^{2}) is a municipal botanical garden located at Neuengrodener Weg 26 in Wilhelmshaven, Lower Saxony, Germany. It is open daily in the warmer months; admission is free.

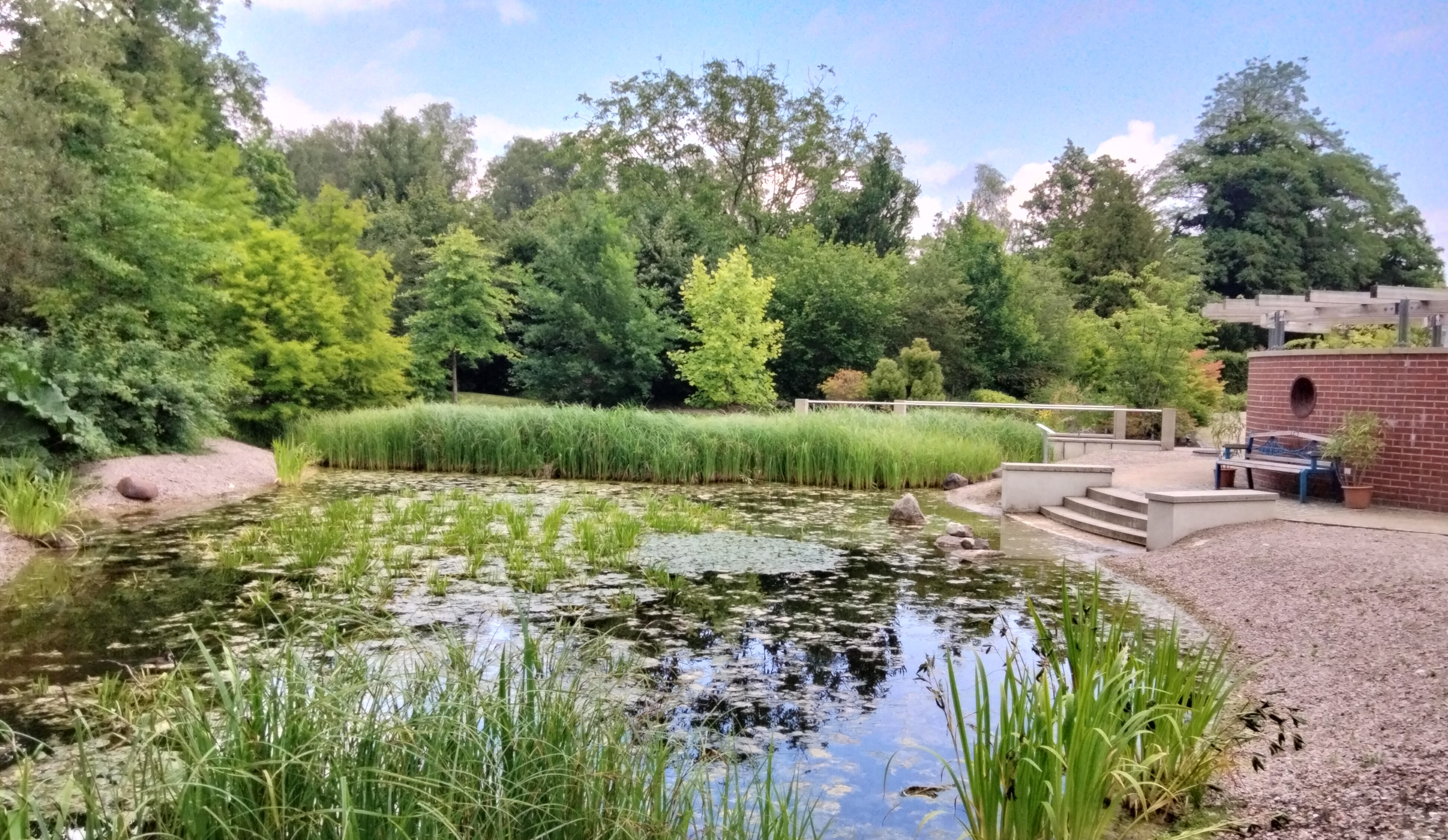
Botanical garden 2024

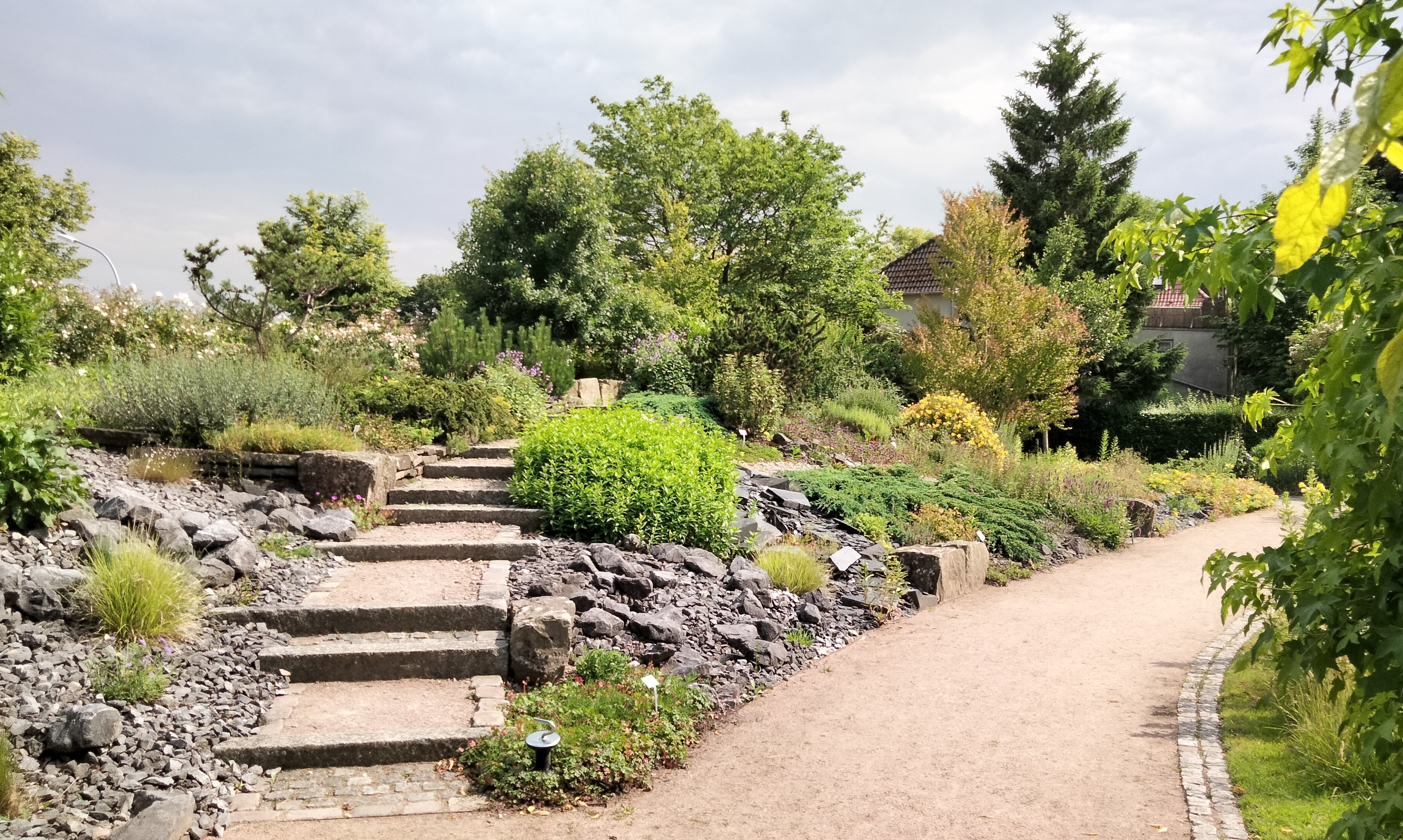
Botanical garden 2024

The garden was established in 1947 as a school garden on the premises of a school (Grodenschule) which had been destroyed by bombs during the Second World War. Its major collection represented typical plants of northern Germany, from environments including heath, dunes, forests, meadows, and ponds. Other outdoor collections included a medicinal garden, ornamental plants, and thematically arranged areas. Its greenhouses contained plants from the Mediterranean, tropics, and subtropics including coffee, cocoa, bananas, sugarcane, rice, carnivorous plants, succulents, epiphytic bromeliads and orchids, and Victoria cruziana. The garden was closed in 2015 and reinaugurated at its present location in 2017.

== See also ==
- List of botanical gardens in Germany
