= Botanischer Garten Wuppertal =

Botanical garden in North Rhine-Westphalia, Germany

Coordinates: 51°15′37″N 7°09′38″E

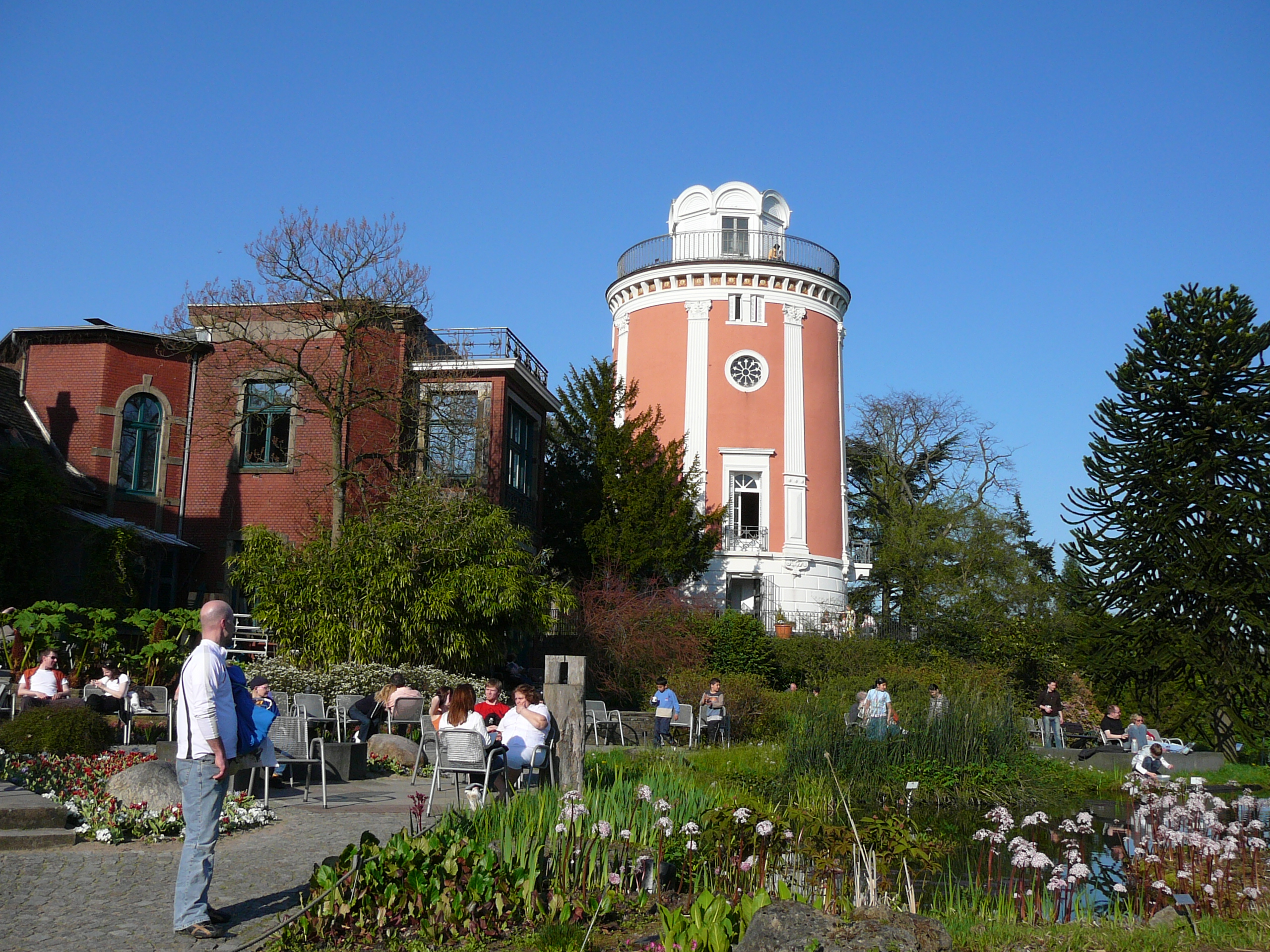
Elise Tower

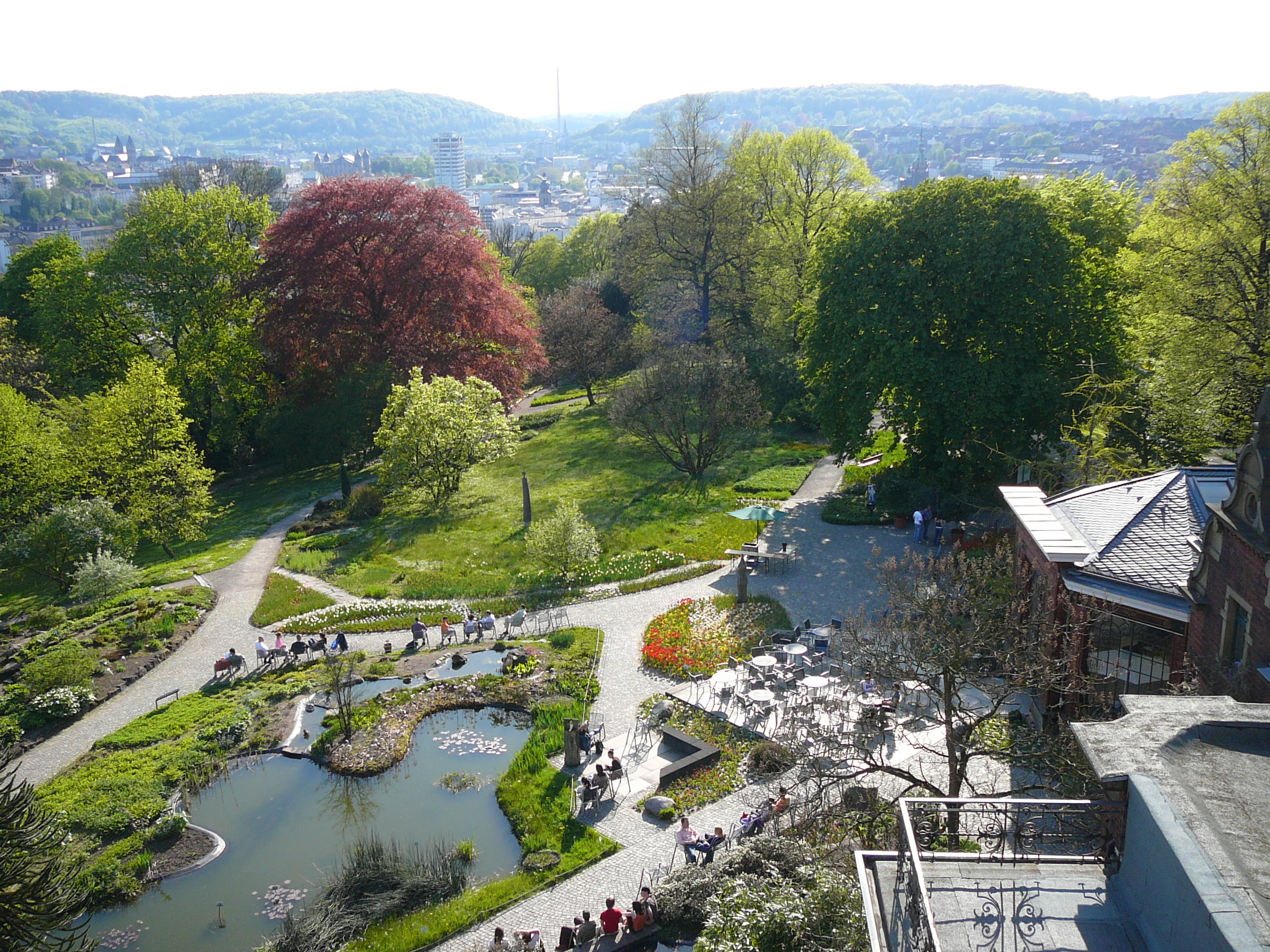
Botanischer Garten Wuppertal

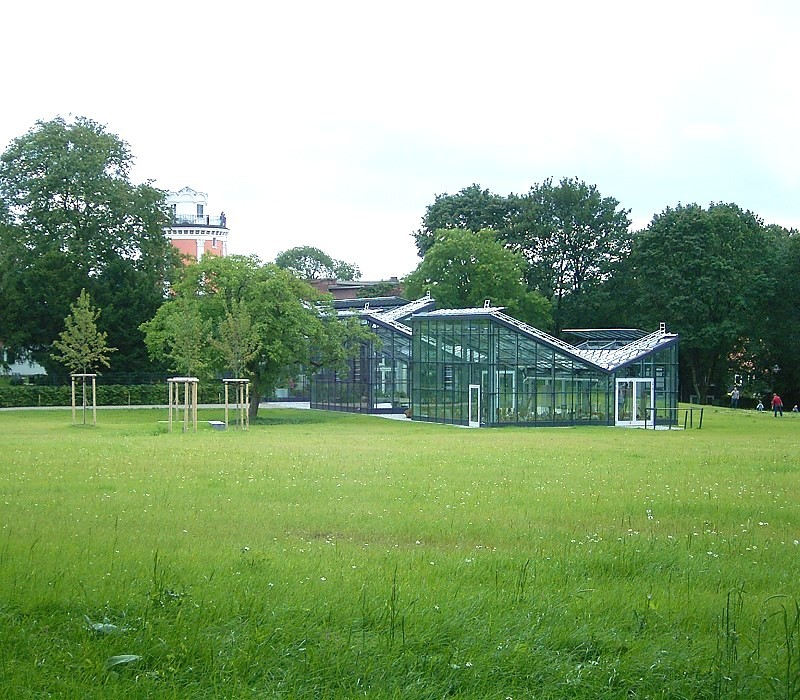
Greenhouses

The Botanischer Garten Wuppertal (2.5 hectares), also known as the Botanischer Garten der Stadt Wuppertal, is a municipal botanical garden located at Elisenhöhe 1, Wuppertal, North Rhine-Westphalia, Germany. It is open daily without charge.

The garden dates to 1890 when a botanical school garden was first created on a 4600 m² plot that is now the Rose Garden. Between 1908-1910 it relocated to today's site, the Villa Eller'schen, a former country house of textile manufacturers named Eller, which contained a villa (built 1820), orangery, residential and farm buildings, and the Elise Tower (built 1838) which provides the garden's focal point. After Wuppertal was established in 1929, it became a municipal botanical garden. In 2006 three new greenhouses were constructed on the former site of the city nursery, thus extending the garden: a large demonstration greenhouse (400 m²) and two smaller ones (each about 100 m²).

Today the garden cultivates about 400 protected species of the genus Babiana, Cyclamen, Gladiolus, Iris, Moraea, Paeonia, Scilla, etc. The large greenhouse contains tropical crops, exhibition and event space, and room for overwintering plants. The smaller greenhouses exhibit bulbs, tuber plants, and cacti.

== See also ==
- List of botanical gardens in Germany
