= Botanic Garden of Würzburg University =

Botanical garden in Bavaria, Germany

Coordinates: 49.7653°N 9.9313°E

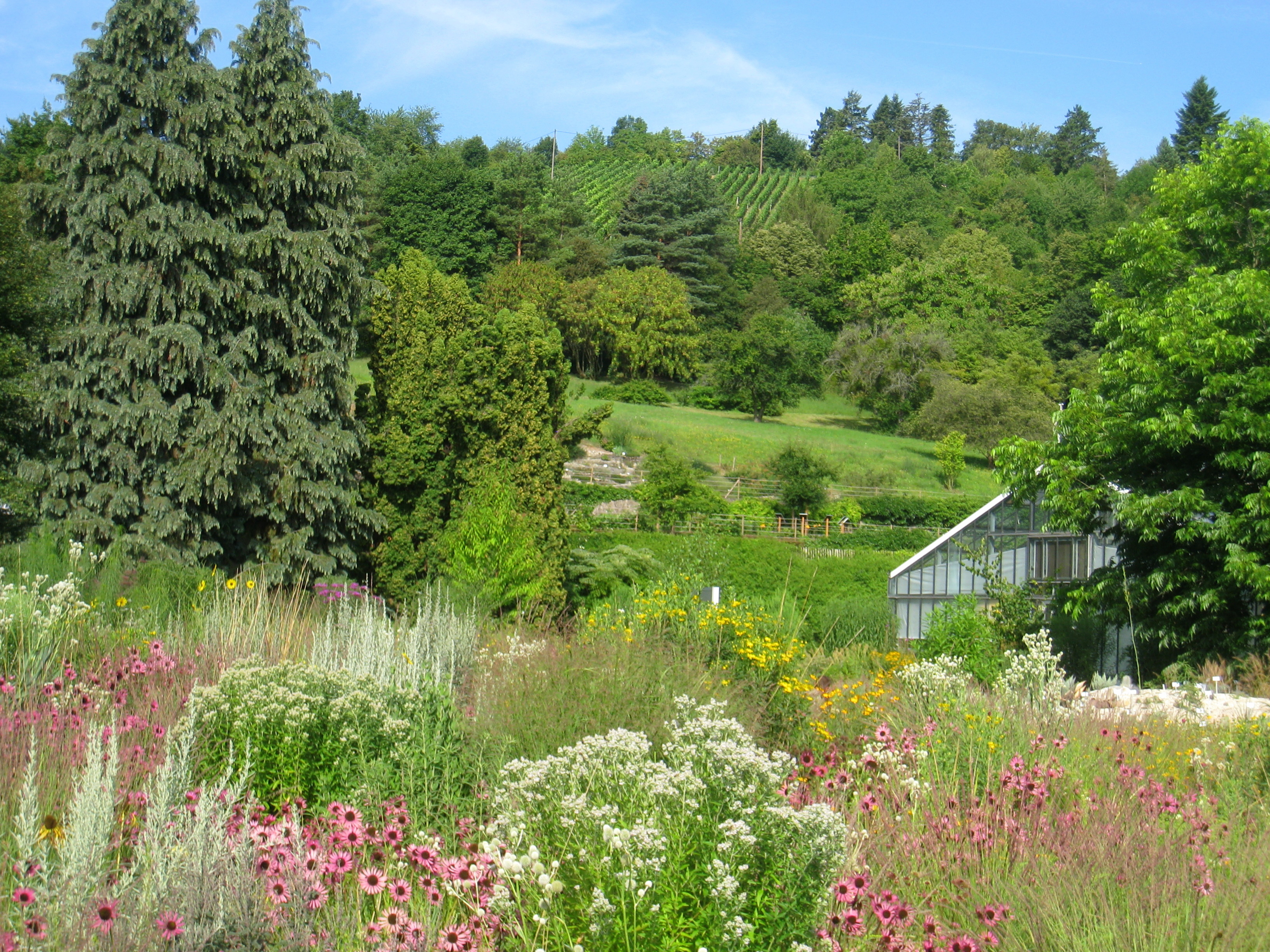
Botanischer Garten der Universität Würzburg

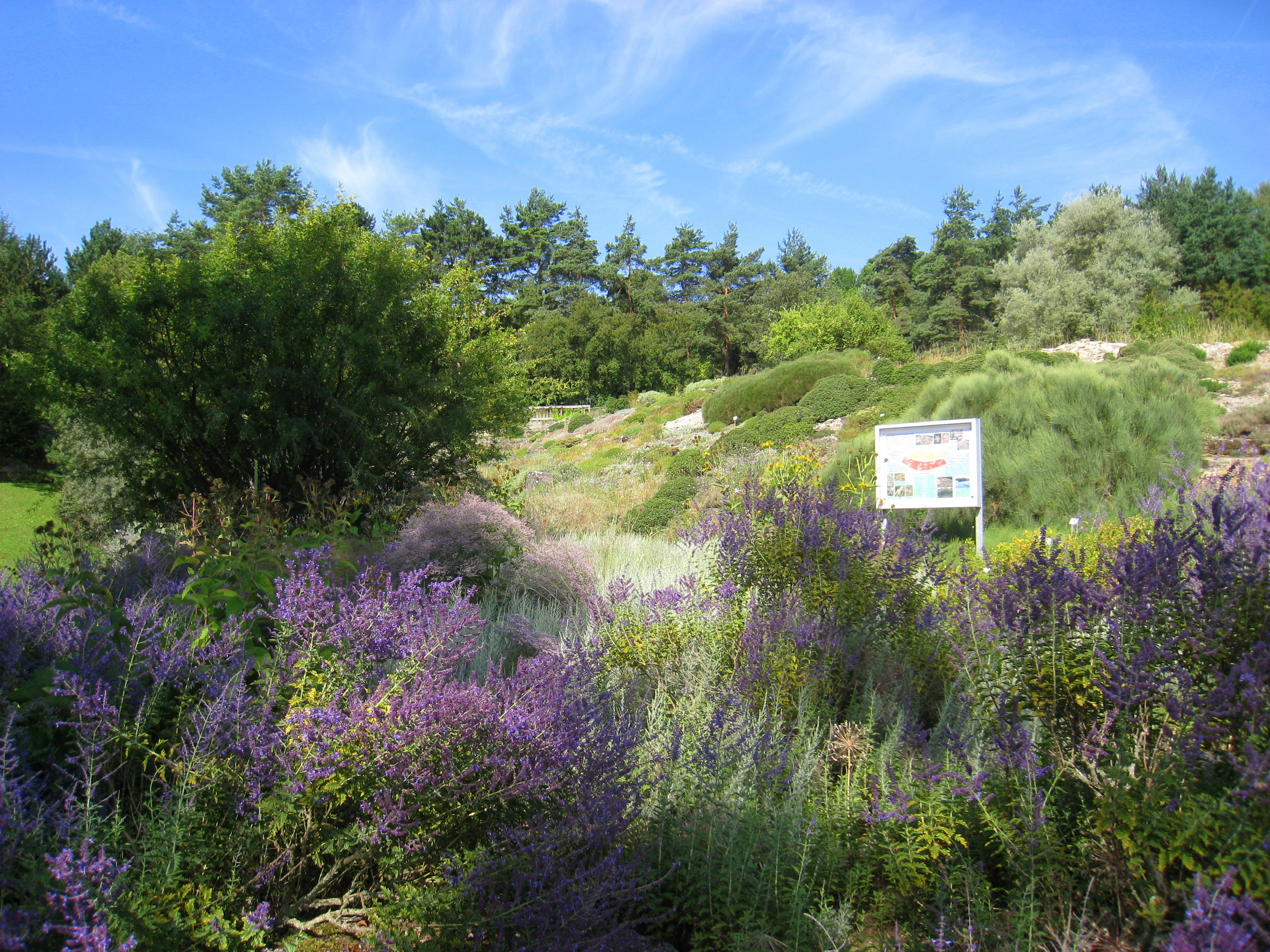
General view

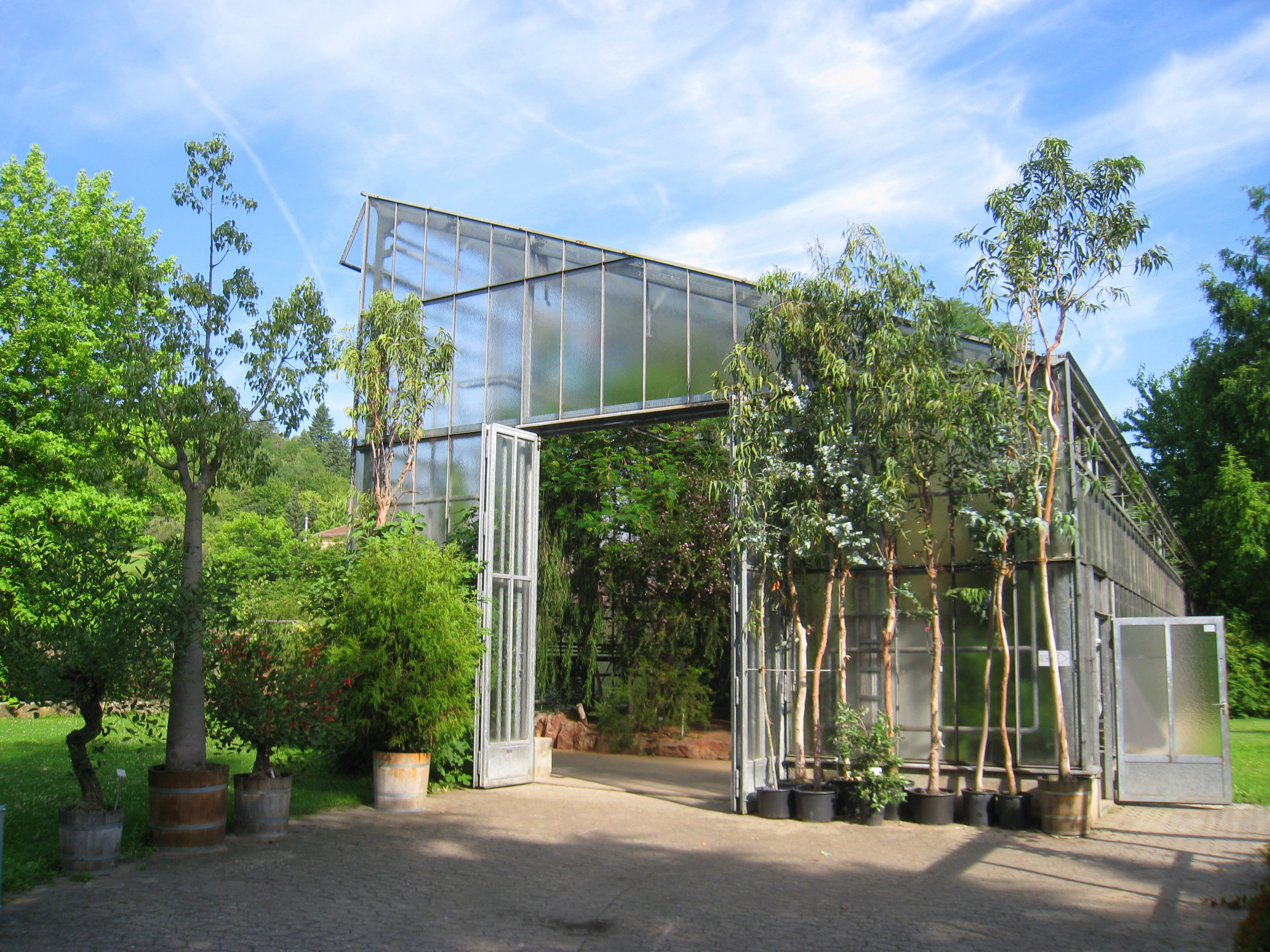
Mediterranean house

The Botanischer Garten der Universität Würzburg (9 hectares) is a botanical garden maintained by the University of Würzburg. It is located at Julius-von-Sachs-Platz 4, Würzburg, Bavaria, Germany, and open daily; admission is free.

The garden was first established in 1696 as a medicinal plant garden in what is now the Julius Hospital's park in today's city center. Its first catalog, published in 1722, listed 423 types of plants including 52 from the region, as well as from the Mediterranean (127 varieties), South Africa (64), Asia (29), Central and South America (26), North America (21), and Atlantic islands (7). Its first greenhouse was built in 1722, with three additional greenhouses added in 1739-41; all were replaced by four new greenhouses in 1787-89. During the late 18th century, however, most of the medicinal plant garden was converted to ornamental gardens, and by 1791 only 3000 m^{2} remained for medicinal plants. This space was intensively cultivated, however, and contained over 6000 species.

In 1833 the garden was reorganized by Linnaean taxonomy, and in 1854 was administratively assigned to the university proper rather than being held jointly with the hospital. As part of this new arrangement, the garden moved in 1854 onto university grounds, then moved again in 1873 to a site near the former Physics Institute, now marked by the X-ray Monument honoring the 1895 discovery of X-rays by Wilhelm Conrad Röntgen. Beginning in 1960 the garden moved to its current location in the city's outskirts, with the plant collections relocated in 1968 to a 7.5-hectare (19-acre) garden, opening ceremony in 1971, and in 1978 an addition of a further 1.5 hectares.

Today the garden cultivates about 10,000 documented plant species, with specialized collections of plants such as tubers and onions, as well as rare native and exotic plants, and a collection honoring Würzburg naturalist Philipp Franz von Siebold (1796–1866) who explored the plants of Japan. The garden contains the following major areas:

- Julius-von-Sachs-Institute of Plant Sciences
- Tropical greenhouses
- Mediterranean courtyard
- Mediterranean greenhouse
- Mediterranean garden
- Alpine plants and alpine house
- Medicinal plants
- North American prairie plants and winter-hardy cacti
- Tree collection
- East Asian garden
- European forest and meadows
- Pond and marsh plants
- Agricultural crops
- Regional plants
- Peony collection

The garden's herbarium contains about 100,000 specimens, with its oldest documents dating to around 1810.

== See also ==
- List of botanical gardens in Germany
