= 1623 =

1623 in various calendars
- Gregorian calendar: 1623; MDCXXIII
- Ab urbe condita: 2376
- Armenian calendar: 1072; ԹՎ ՌՀԲ
- Assyrian calendar: 6373
- Balinese saka calendar: 1544–1545
- Bengali calendar: 1029–1030
- Berber calendar: 2573
- English Regnal year: 20 Ja. 1 – 21 Ja. 1
- Buddhist calendar: 2167
- Burmese calendar: 985
- Byzantine calendar: 7131–7132
- Chinese calendar: 壬戌年 (Water Dog); 4320 or 4113 — to — 癸亥年 (Water Pig); 4321 or 4114
- Coptic calendar: 1339–1340
- Discordian calendar: 2789
- Ethiopian calendar: 1615–1616
- Hebrew calendar: 5383–5384
- Hindu calendars
- Vikram Samvat: 1679–1680
- Shaka Samvat: 1544–1545
- Kali Yuga: 4723–4724
- Holocene calendar: 11623
- Igbo calendar: 623–624
- Iranian calendar: 1001–1002
- Islamic calendar: 1032–1033
- Japanese calendar: Genna 9 (元和９年)
- Javanese calendar: 1544–1545
- Julian calendar: Gregorian minus 10 days
- Korean calendar: 3956
- Minguo calendar: 289 before ROC 民前289年
- Nanakshahi calendar: 155
- Thai solar calendar: 2165–2166
- Tibetan calendar: ཆུ་ཕོ་ཁྱི་ལོ་ (male Water-Dog); 1749 or 1368 or 596 — to — ཆུ་མོ་ཕག་ལོ་ (female Water-Boar); 1750 or 1369 or 597

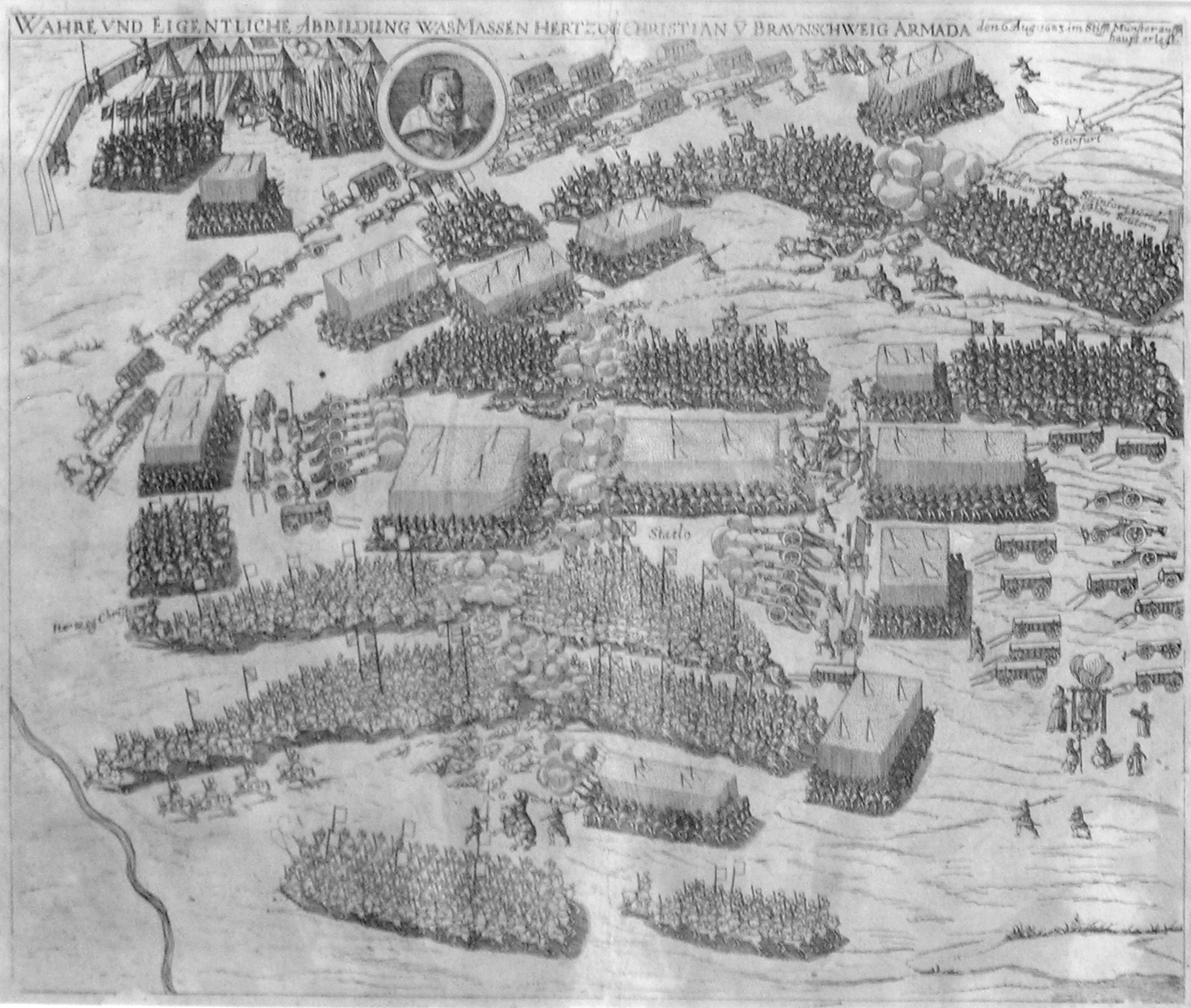
August 6: The Battle of Stadtlohn takes place.

1623 (MDCXXIII) was a common year starting on Sunday of the Gregorian calendar and a common year starting on Wednesday of the Julian calendar, the 1623rd year of the Common Era (CE) and Anno Domini (AD) designations, the 623rd year of the 2nd millennium, the 23rd year of the 17th century, and the 4th year of the 1620s decade. As of the start of 1623, the Gregorian calendar was 10 days ahead of the Julian calendar, which remained in localized use until 1923.

== Events ==
=== January–March ===
- January 21
  - Viscount Falkland, England's Lord Deputy of Ireland, issues a proclamation ordering all Roman Catholic priests to leave Ireland, affecting negotiations over the "Spanish match" (which resume in March).
  - Voyage of the Pera and Arnhem to Australia: Captains Jan Carstenszoon of the Arnhem and Willem Joosten van Coolsteerdt of the Pera depart on an expedition for the Dutch East India Company from Ambon, Maluku (Amboyna) to explore the Australian coast.
- January – Battle of Mbanda Kasi: Forces from the Kingdom of Kongo defeat the Portuguese.
- February 7 – France, Savoy and Venice sign the Treaty of Paris, agreeing to cooperate in removing Spanish forces from the strategic Alpine pass of Valtelline.
- February 25 – Thirty Years' War: Duke Maximilian I of Bavaria becomes Elector of the Electorate of the Palatinate.
- March 5 – The first American temperance law is enacted, in Virginia.
- March 7 – Charles, Prince of Wales, the future King Charles I of England, travelling incognito with royal favourite George Villiers, arrives in Madrid to pursue negotiations over the "Spanish match", the Protestant Charles's proposed marriage with the Catholic Habsburg Infanta Maria Anna of Spain.
- March 9 – Amboyna massacre: Ten English merchants in the service of the British East India Company, together with nine Japanese and one Portuguese, are executed by agents of the Dutch East India Company in Ambon, Maluku (Amboyna).
- March 14 – In the Korean kingdom of Joseon, Crown Prince Yi Ji is deposed and exiled to Ganghwa Island, where he dies soon after.
- March 20 – Richard Frethorne begins writing a letter to his parents from Jamestown, Virginia.

=== April–June ===
- April 11 – King Gwanghaegun of Joseon (in Korea) is deposed in the Injo coup and succeeded by King Injo.
- April 29 – A fleet of 11 Dutch ships depart for the coast of Peru, seeking to seize Spanish treasure.
- May 5 – Raja Gaj Singh of Marwar, along with Mahabat Khan and Parviz Mirza, is deputized by the Mughal Emperor Jahangir in India to hunt down Jahangir's rebel son, Shihab-ud-Din Muhammad Khurram. The search fails, and Khurram will become the Mughal Emperor Shah Jahan after Jahangir's death in 1627.
- May 8 – A Dutch East India Company party, led by explorer Jan Carstenszoon, fights a skirmish with 200 indigenous Australian Wik peoples.
- May 22 – After negotiations for the release of English women taken from Jamestown in the British North American colony of Virginia, conducted between Captain William Tucker of the English settlers and Chief Opchanacanough of the Powhatan Confederacy, the English arrange a banquet with the Powhatan, and the drinking of wine. The wine is poisoned and many of the Powhatan Indians die, while 50 more are killed while ill. This follows the massacre of 347 English colonists of March 22, 1622, in the Powhatan uprising. Opchanacanough escapes, and the 20 women never return home.
- June 14 – The first breach-of-promise lawsuit: Rev. Gerville Pooley, in Virginia, files against Cicely Jordan, but loses.
- June 29 – Première of Pedro Calderón de la Barca's first play, Amor, honor y poder (Love, Honor and Power), at the Court of Habsburg Spain.

=== July–September ===
- July 8 – Pope Gregory XV (Alessandro Ludovisi) dies from a kidney ailment after a reign of a little more than two years.
- July 10 – The English ship Anne becomes the third vessel to bring settlers to Plymouth Colony, the Puritan settlement in modern-day Massachusetts, carrying more settlers, after the Mayflower on November 21, 1620, and the Fortune on November 9, 1621.
- July 15 – Trịnh Tùng is deposed as ruler of the kingdom of Đại Việt in northern Vietnam after more than 50 years. His son, Trịnh Xuan, burns the palace. Trinh Tung is carried away by his servants in a sedan chair and abandoned in the road to die. Another son, Trịnh Tráng, succeeds to the throne of Đại Việt.
- July 16 – A great conjunction of Jupiter and Saturn, with the planets only 5 arc minutes apart, the closest between 1226 and 2874. This conjunction likely goes unobserved, as it occurs near the Sun and the telescope has been invented only recently.
- July 30 (probable date) – The second Thanksgiving is celebrated in Plymouth Colony.
- August 5 – The English ship Little James arrives at Plymouth Colony, 26 days after the Anne.
- August 6
  - 1623 papal conclave: Pope Urban VIII (Maffeo Barberini) succeeds Pope Gregory XV, as the 235th pope.
  - Thirty Years' War: Pursued by the army of the Catholic League (German) led by Johann Tserclaes, Count of Tilly, the army of the Protestant Electoral Palatinate led by Christian the Younger of Brunswick attempts to flee to the Dutch Republic. Tilly's army catches Brunswick five miles from the border. In the resulting Battle of Stadtlohn, Christian's army is destroyed. This brings the Palatinate campaign to an end.
- August 23 – In Japan, shogun Tokugawa Hidetada resigns and is succeeded by his son Tokugawa Iemitsu.
- August 30 – Negotiations, resumed in March, of the planned "Spanish match" break down. On October 5, Prince Charles returns to England from Spain without a bride.
- September 10 – Murad IV, age 11, succeeds his deposed uncle Mustafa I as Ottoman Emperor. Because Murad is a minor, his mother, Kösem Sultan, serves as regent until 1632.

=== October–December ===
- October 9 – Kara Mustafa Pasha is replaced as the Ottoman Governor of Egypt on orders of Sultan Murad IV.
- October 20 – Cardinal Antonio Marcello Barberini informs Galileo Galilei that his brother, the newly-enthroned Pope Urban VIII, wishes to receive a visit from Galileo.
- October 26 – "Fatal Vespers": 95 people are killed when an upper floor of the French ambassador's house in London collapses under the weight of a congregation attending a mass.
- November 1
  - The Battle of Anjar is fought in modern-day Lebanon as the Druze emir Fakhr al-Din II defeats an invasion by Mustafa Pasha al-Hannaq, the Ottoman Governor of Damascus, and takes him prisoner.
  - Fire at Plymouth Colony destroys several buildings.
- November 8–December 5 – Publication between these dates in London of the "First Folio" (Mr. William Shakespeares Comedies, Histories, & Tragedies), a collection of 36 of the plays of Shakespeare, half of which have not previously been printed.
- December 4 – 50 Christians are executed in Edo, Japan, during the Great Martyrdom of Edo.

=== Date unknown ===
- In British America:
  - On the coast of Massachusetts Bay, the settlement that will become the City of Gloucester, Massachusetts, is first inhabited by men from Dorchester, Dorset, England.
  - On the coast of New Hampshire, the settlement of Hilton's Point, which will become Dover, New Hampshire, is established by men from London, England, the first European settlers in the state.
- The 1623 Malta plague outbreak is contained after killing around 40 people on the island of Malta.
- Erotomania, a delusional disorder, is first mentioned, in a psychiatric treatise.
- Johannes Rudbeck founds Rudbeckianska gymnasiet, the first gymnasium in Sweden.
- Gabriel Bethlen, Prince of Transylvania, issues an order, dated at Kolozsvár/Klausenburg/Cluj, that allows Jews to settle, trade freely and practice religion in Transylvania, and exempts them from wearing the usual Jewish sign.
- Procopius' long-lost Secret History is rediscovered, in the Vatican Library.
- Italian poet Giambattista Marini's epic L'Adone is published in Paris.
- Imprisoned Italian Dominican philosopher Tommaso Campanella's utopian The City of the Sun is published in Latin (as Civitas Solis) in Frankfurt.
- Wilhelm Schickard devizes a Calculating Clock, an early mechanical calculator.
- Zildjian begins the commercial manufacture of cymbals in Turkey. The company will still be operating, from Massachusetts, in the 21st century.

== Births ==
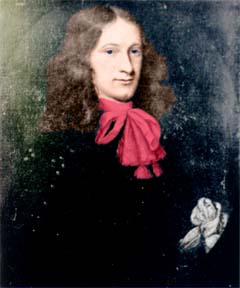
Wilhelmus Beekman

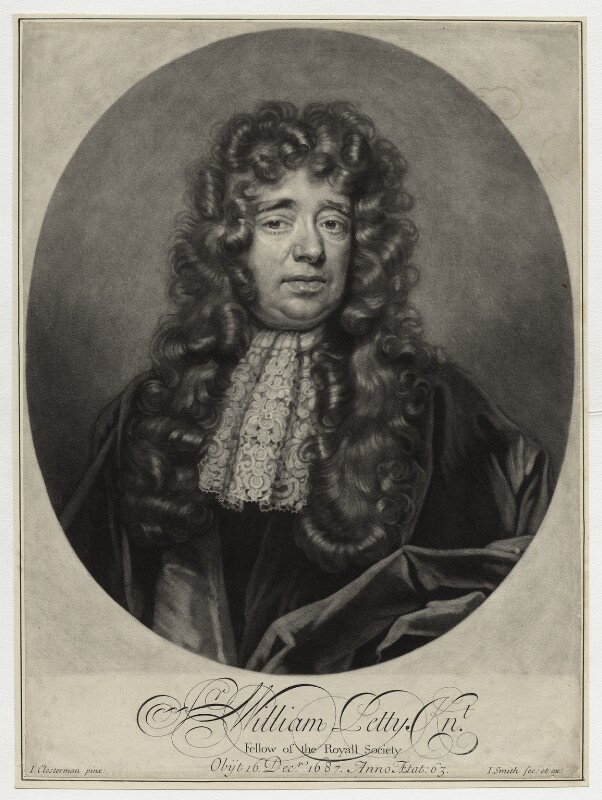
William Petty

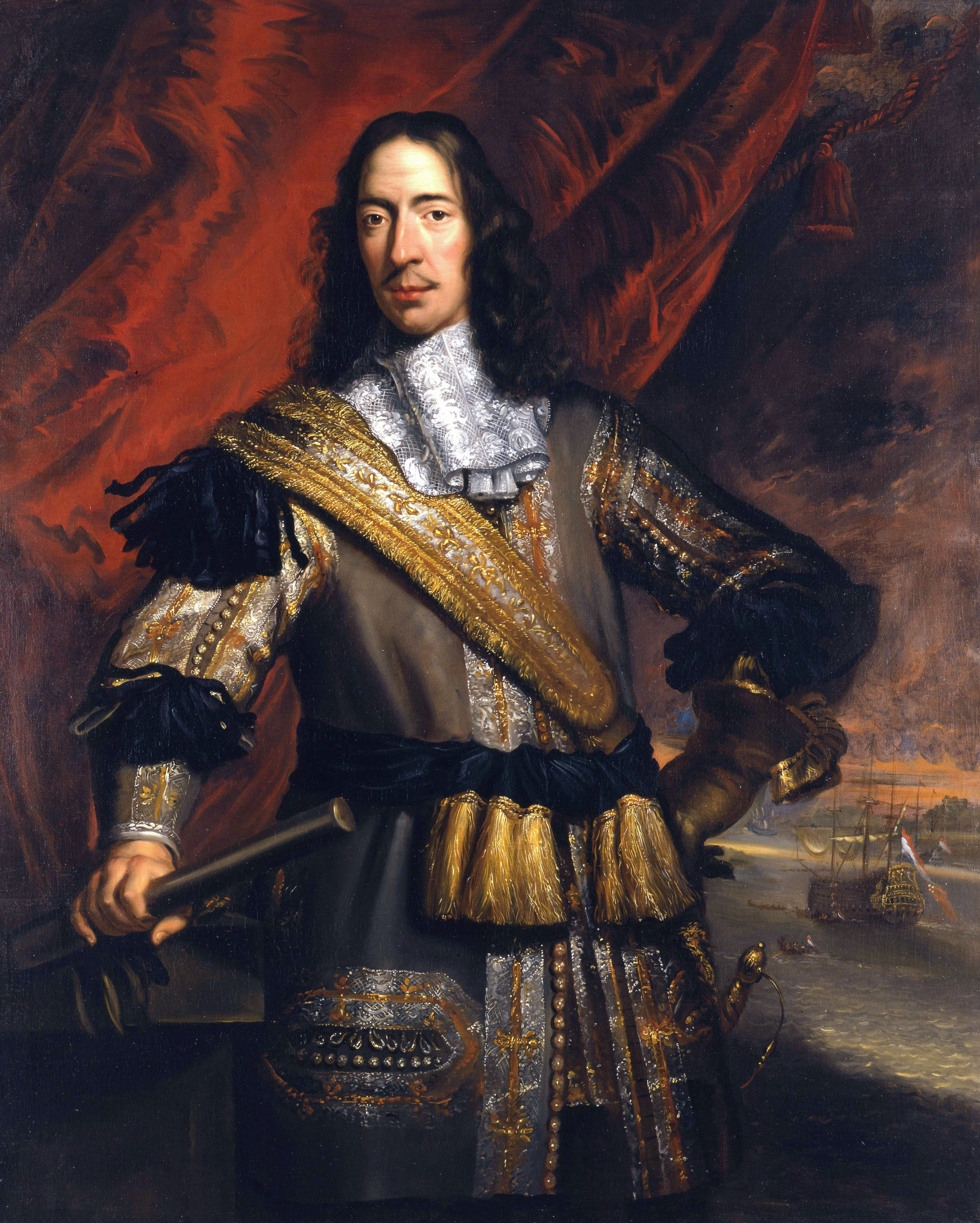
Cornelis de Witt

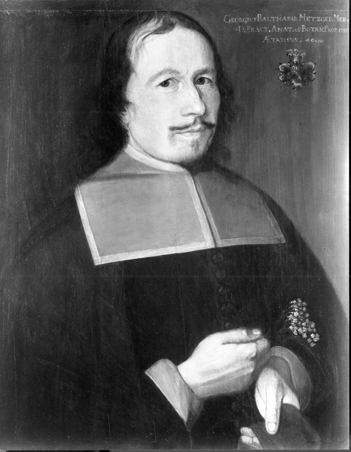
Georg Balthasar Metzger

=== January–March ===
- January 1 – Marie Eleonore of Dietrichstein, German noblewoman, by birth member of the House of Dietrichstein, and by her two marriages Countess of Kaunitz and Oppersdorf (d. 1687)
- January 15 – Algernon Sidney, British philosopher (d. 1683)
- March 4 – Jacob van der Does, Dutch landscape painter (d. 1673)
- March 5 – Henri Sauval, French historian (d. 1676)
- March 23 – Deane Winthrop, English-born colonist of British America, 6th son of Governor John Winthrop (d. 1704)
- March 24 – Sir Ralph Hare, 1st Baronet, English politician (d. 1672)

=== April–June ===
- April 7 – Thomas Mainwaring, English politician (d. 1689)
- April 11 – Decio Azzolino, Italian Catholic cardinal (d. 1689)
- April 20 – Olimpia Aldobrandini, Italian Aldobrandini family member, heiress (d. 1681)
- April 23 – Sir John Chichester, 1st Baronet, English politician (d. 1667)
- April 27 – Gryzelda Konstancja Zamoyska, Polish noble (d. 1672)
- April 28 – Wilhelmus Beekman, Dutch politician (d. 1707)
- April 30 – François de Laval, French-born priest, first Catholic bishop of Quebec (d. 1708)
- May 26 – William Petty, English scientist, philosopher and economist (d. 1687)
- May 29 – David Schirmer, German lyric poet and librarian (d. 1686)
- May 30
  - John Egerton, 2nd Earl of Bridgewater, English politician (d. 1686)
  - Wallerant Vaillant, painter of the Dutch Golden Age (d. 1677)
- June 8 – Paluzzo Paluzzi Altieri degli Albertoni, Italian Catholic cardinal (d. 1698)
- June 15 – Cornelis de Witt, Dutch politician (d. 1672)
- June 19 – Blaise Pascal, French mathematician, physicist and philosopher (d. 1662)
- June 29 – Inaba Masanori, Japanese daimyō (d. 1696)

=== July–September ===
- July 1 – William Owfield, English landowner and politician (d. 1664)
- July 6 – Jacopo Melani, Italian composer and violinist (d. 1676)
- July 12 – Elizabeth Walker, English pharmacist (d. 1690)
- July 28 – Allen Brodrick, English politician (d. 1680)
- August 4 – Friedrich Casimir, Count of Hanau-Lichtenberg (1641–1680) and Hanau-Münzenberg (1642–1680) (d. 1685)
- August 5 (baptism) – Antonio Cesti, Italian composer (d. 1669)
- August 13 – Sir John Morden, 1st Baronet, English politician (d. 1708)
- August 14 – Sir John Fowell, 2nd Baronet, English politician (d. 1677)
- August 23 – Stanisław Lubieniecki, Polish Socinian theologist (d. 1675)
- August 25 – Filippo Lauri, Italian painter (d. 1694)
- August 26 – Johann Sigismund Elsholtz, German naturalist and physician (d. 1688)
- September 1 – Caspar Schamberger, German surgeon and merchant (d. 1706)
- September 8 – James Bellingham, English politician (d. 1650)
- September 10 – Carpoforo Tencalla, Swiss-Italian Baroque painter of canvases and frescoes (d. 1685)
- September 13 – Pieter Wouwerman, Dutch painter (d. 1682)
- September 21 – Sir John Bowyer, 1st Baronet, English soldier and politician (d. 1666)
- September 23 – Georg Balthasar Metzger, German physician and scientist (d. 1687)

=== October–December ===
- October 4 – Robert Thoroton, English antiquary (d. 1678)
- October 9 – Ferdinand Verbiest, Flemish Jesuit missionary in China during the Qing dynasty (d. 1688)
- October 17 – Francis Turretin, Swiss-Italian Reformed scholastic theologian (d. 1687)
- October 28 – Johann Grueber, Austrian Jesuit missionary and astronomer in China (d. 1680)
- November 1 – Zhu Youlang, Prince of Gui, the Yongli Emperor, the 4th and last emperor of the Southern Ming dynasty of China (d. 1662)
- November 5 – Mariana of the Purification, Portuguese nun of the Carmelite Order of the Ancient Observance (d. 1695)
- November 17 – Philip Sherard, English politician (d. 1695)
- November 22 – Bussy Mansell, Welsh member of the Parliament of England (d. 1699)
- November 28 – Giovanni Battista Caccioli, Italian painter (d. 1675)
- December 1 – Christian Louis I, Duke of Mecklenburg-Schwerin (1658–1692) (d. 1692)
- December 8 – Ernest, Landgrave of Hesse-Rheinfels and later of Hessen-Rheinfels-Rotenburg (d. 1693)
- December 13 – Marc-René de Voyer de Paulmy d'Argenson, French politician and diplomat (d. 1700)
- December 16 – Ercole, Marquis of Baux, member of the House of Grimaldi (d. 1651)
- December 23 – Matthias Palbitzki, Swedish diplomat and art-connoisseur (d. 1677)
- December 28 – Elisabeth Augusta Lindenov, daughter of king Christian IV of Denmark (d. 1677)

=== Date unknown ===
- Margaret Cavendish, Duchess of Newcastle-upon-Tyne, English biographer, poet and philosopher (d. 1673)
- Mary Fisher, English-born Quaker preacher and missionary (d. 1698)
- Dorothy, Lady Pakington, English religious writer (d. 1679)
- Francis Talbot, 11th Earl of Shrewsbury, English Royalist (d. 1667)

== Deaths ==
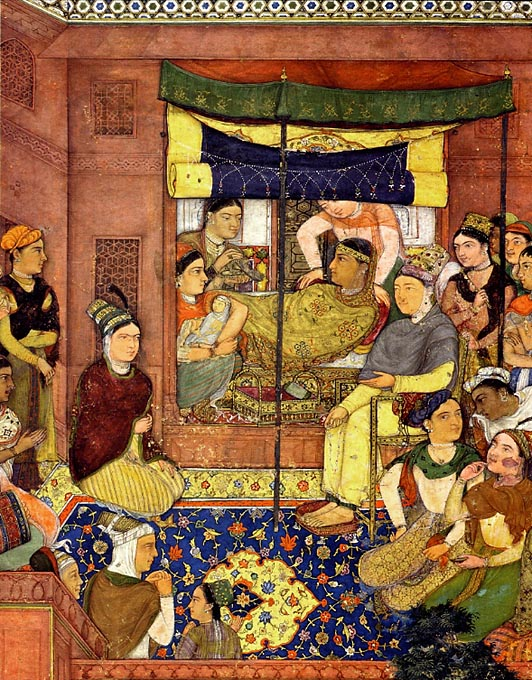
Mariam-uz-Zamani

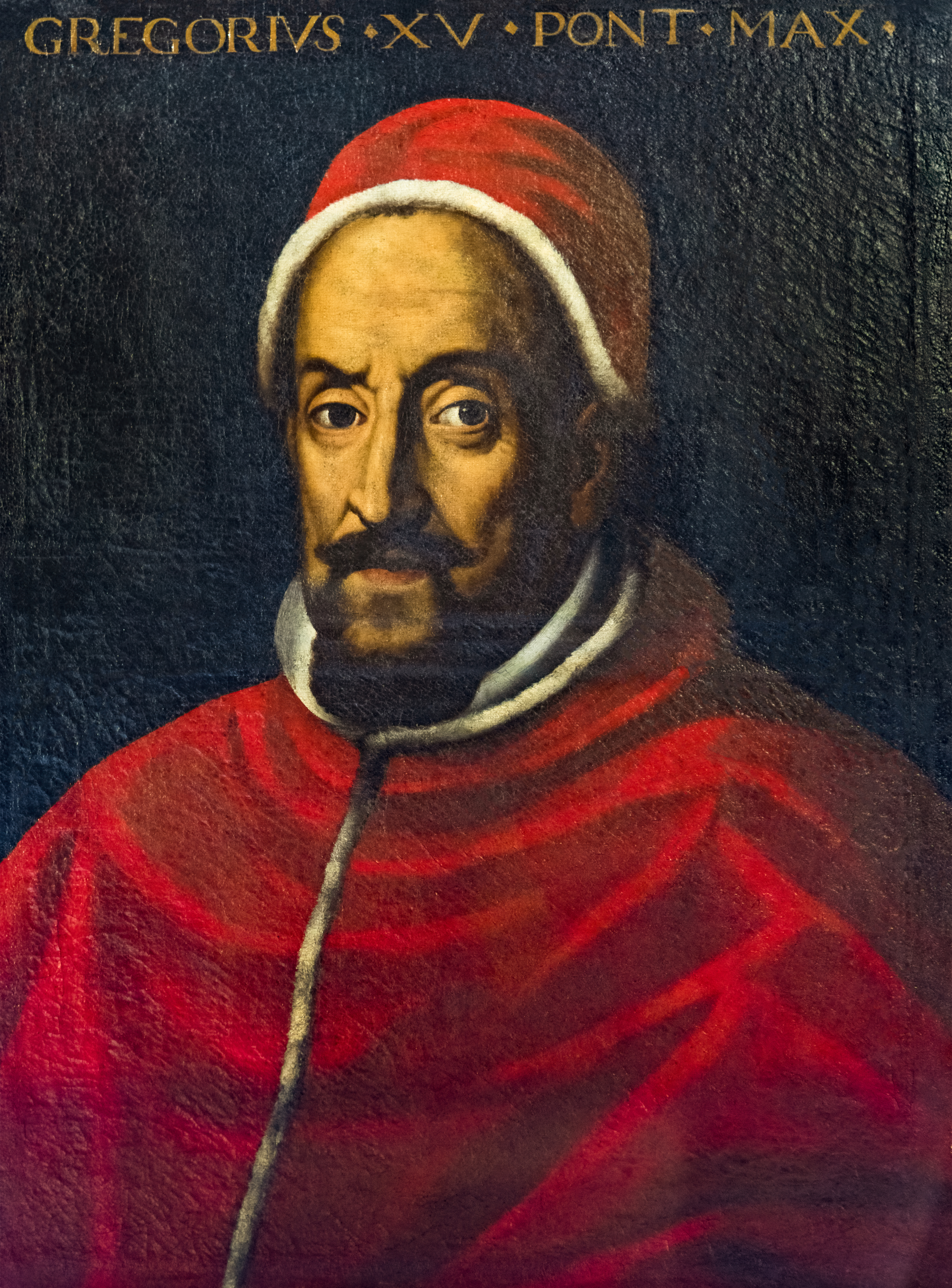
Pope Gregory XV died 8 July

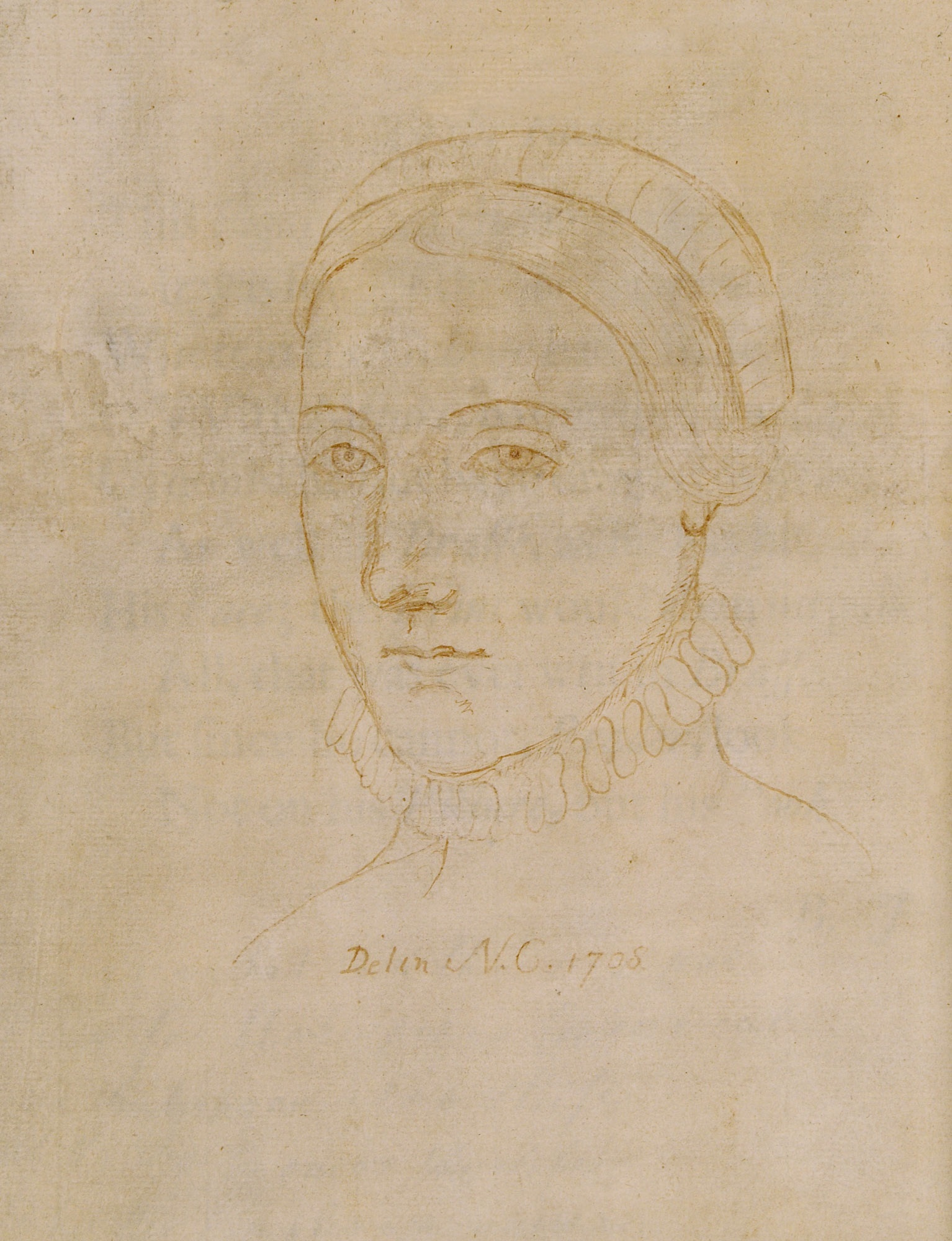
Anne Hathaway

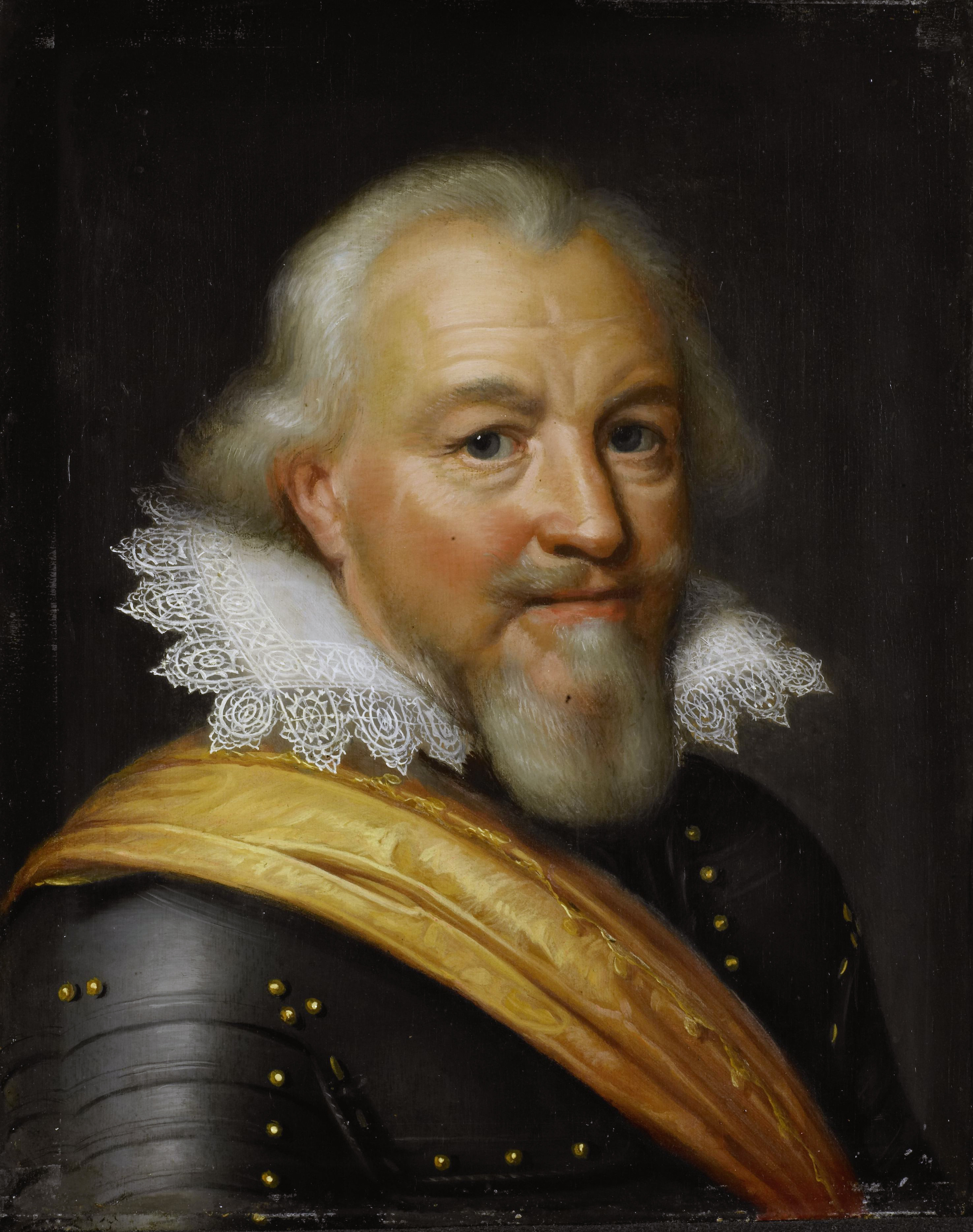
John VII, Count of Nassau-Siegen

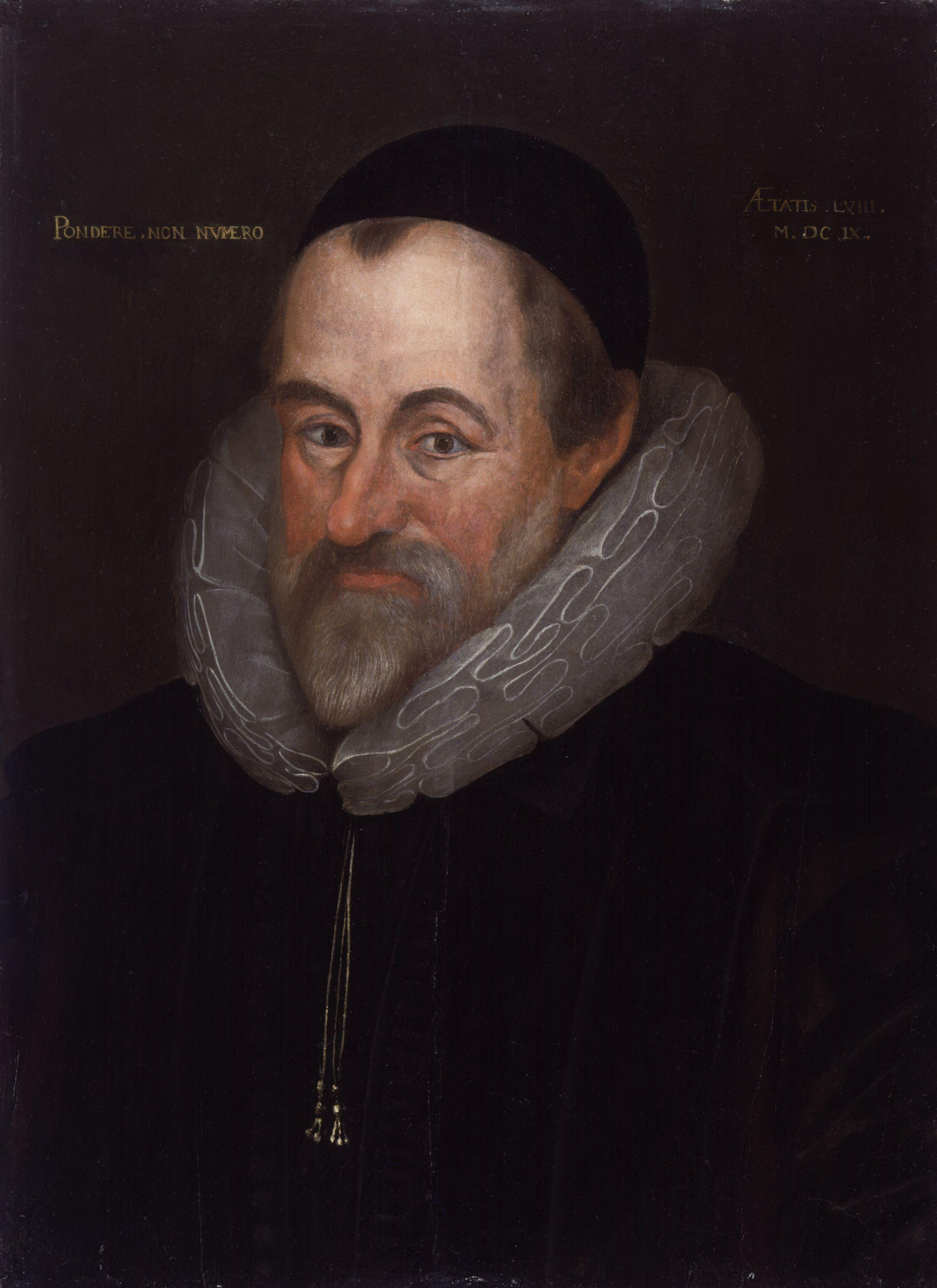
William Camden

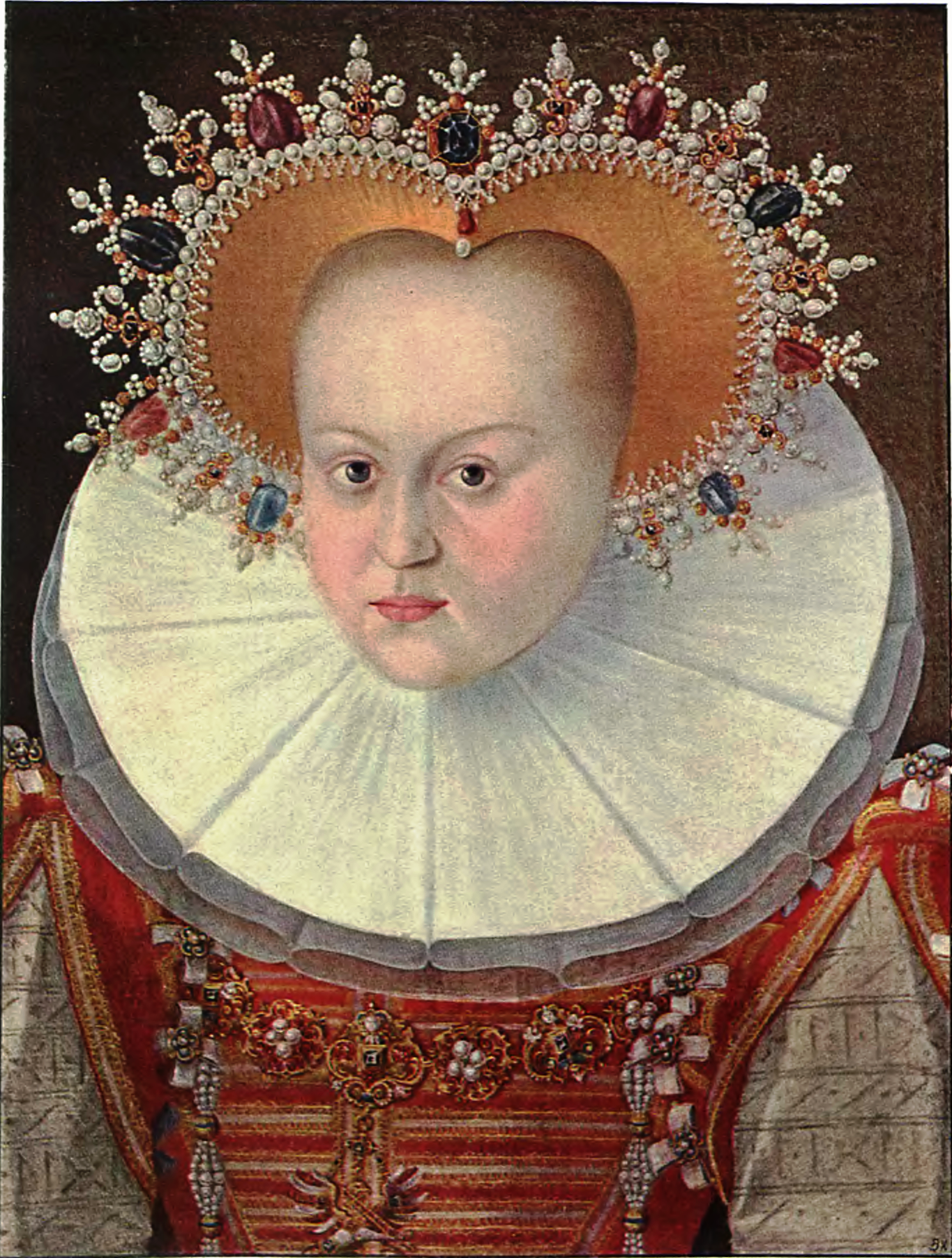
Erdmuthe of Brandenburg

=== January–March ===
- January 1
  - Paul Hentzner, German lawyer and traveller in England (b. 1558)
  - Christopher Heydon, English politician (b. 1561)
- January 11 – Pieter van Mierevelt, Dutch painter (b. 1596)
- January 15
  - Paolo Sarpi, Italian theologian (b. 1552)
  - Leonardus Lessius, Flemish Jesuit theologian (b. 1554)
- February – Malcolm Macfie, last chief of the Scottish clan Clan Macfie
- February 8 – Thomas Cecil, 1st Earl of Exeter, English politician (b. 1546)
- February 19 – Clara Maria of Pomerania-Barth, German noble (b. 1574)
- March 7 – Luís Mendes de Vasconcellos, Portuguese 55th Grandmaster of the Knights Hospitaller (b. c. 1542)
- March 19 – Philip Sigismund of Brunswick-Wolfenbüttel, German Catholic bishop (b. 1568)
- March 25 – Henri de La Tour d'Auvergne, Duke of Bouillon (b. 1555)
- March 29 – Scévole de Sainte-Marthe, French poet (b. 1536)

=== April–June ===
- April 14 – John Scudamore, English politician (b. 1542)
- April 19 – Uesugi Kagekatsu, Japanese samurai and warlord (b. 1556)
- April 26 – Bálint Lépes, Hungarian cardinal (b. c. 1570)
- April 27 – Eric of Lorraine, Bishop of Verdun (b. 1576)
- May 1 – Matthew Clerke, English politician (b. 1564)
- May 4 – Asprilio Pacelli, Italian Baroque composer (b. 1570)
- May 19 – Mariam-uz-Zamani, Empress of the Mughal Empire (b. 1542)
- May 23 – Edward Lawley, English politician (b. 1586)
- May 26 – Francis Anthony, English apothecary and physician (b. 1550)
- June 28 – Federico Ubaldo della Rovere, Duke of Urbino, Italian noble (b. 1605)

=== July–September ===
- July 3 – Claes Michielsz Bontenbal, Dutch civil servant (b. 1575)
- July 4 – William Byrd, English composer (b. 1543)
- July 8 – Pope Gregory XV (b. 1554)
- July 12 – William Bourchier, 3rd Earl of Bath (b. 1557)
- August 6 – Anne Hathaway, wife of English dramatist William Shakespeare (b. 1555)
- August 9 – George, Count of Nassau-Dillenburg, Count of Nassau-Beilstein (1607–1620), then Count of Nassau-Dillenburg (1620–1623) (b. 1562)
- August 12
  - Antonio Priuli, Doge of Venice (b. 1548)
  - Stefano Pignatelli, Italian Catholic cardinal (b. 1578)
- August 31 – Jacob van Wassenaer Duivenvoorde, Dutch admiral (b. 1574)
- September 1 – Marcantonio Gozzadini, Italian Catholic cardinal (b. 1574)
- September 26 – Edwin Sandys, English politician (b. 1591)
- September 27 – John VII, Count of Nassau-Siegen (b. 1561)
- September 28 – Johann Georg, Prince of Hohenzollern-Hechingen (b. 1577)

=== October–December ===
- October 21 – William Wade, English statesman and diplomat (b. 1546)
- October 31 – Deposed Queen Yu, consort of Yi Hon, King Gwanghae of Joseon (b. 1576)
- November 9 – William Camden, English antiquarian (b. 1551)
- November 11 – Philippe de Mornay, French writer (b. 1549)
- November 12 – Josaphat Kuncevyc, Lithuanian archbishop (b. c. 1582)
- November 13 – Erdmuthe of Brandenburg, Duchess of Pomerania-Stettin (b. 1561)
- December 4 – Jerome de Angelis, Italian Jesuit missionary to Japan (b. 1567)
- December 24 – Michiel Coignet, Flemish mathematician, astronomer, engineer and scientific instrument maker (b. 1549)

=== Date unknown ===
- Andrea Andreani, Italian engraver (b. 1540)
