= Alter Botanischer Garten Tübingen =

Coordinates: 48.5234°N 9.0571°E

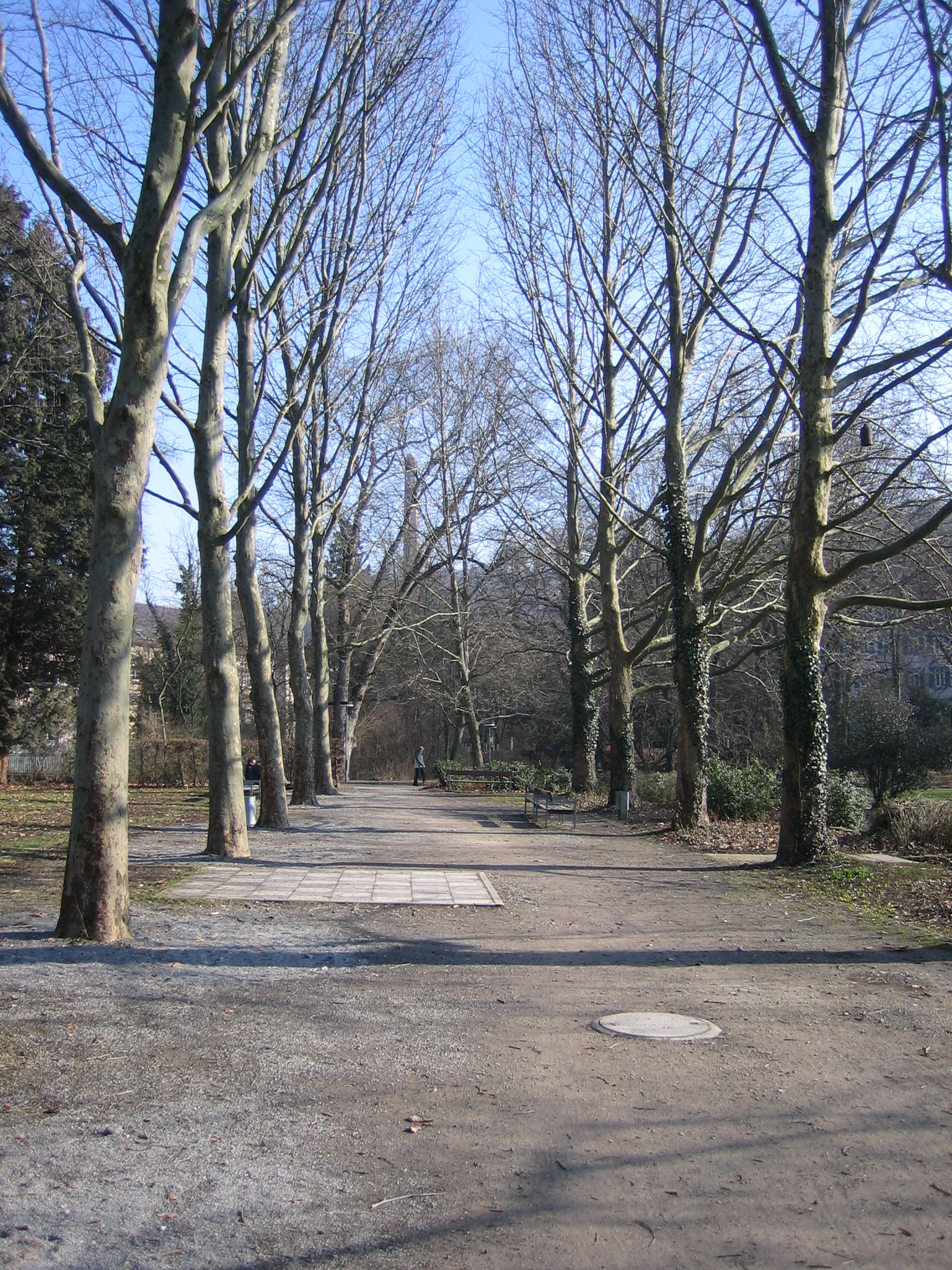
Alter Botanischer Garten Tübingen

The Alter Botanischer Garten Tübingen (English: The Old Botanic Garden) is the former botanical garden of the University of Tübingen, now a municipal park. It is located at Am Stadtgraben 9, Tübingen, Baden-Württemberg, Germany, and open daily without charge.

== History ==
The garden traces back to 1535 when medicinal plants were first grown by Leonhart Fuchs (1501-1566) beside the Nonnenhaus (House of the Nuns), which still exists. In 1663 a Hortus medicus was created by direction of Eberhard III, Duke of Württemberg (1614–74), with university gardener appointed in 1666. In 1681 Georg Balthasar Metzger (1623-1687) was named director, followed in 1688 by Rudolph Jacob Camerarius (1655-1721). The first greenhouse was completed in 1744, and noted botanist Johann Georg Gmelin (1709-1755) appointed director in 1751.

In 1804 a new garden was established by decree of King Frederick of Württemberg (1754-1816) under the leadership of Professor Carl Friedrich Kielmeyer (1765-1844), which grew and flourished throughout the first half of the nineteenth century. By 1809 it contained four greenhouses and a lecture hall, with its first seed catalog published in 1820, and from 1818-1825 its plants were reorganized according to the system of Antoine Laurent de Jussieu. In 1846 a substantial institute building was completed and by 1859 the garden cultivated 5,226 species. In 1866 the garden's final expansion was made with the purchase of adjacent private land. In 1878 Wilhelm Pfeffer (1845-1920) became director, who inaugurated a sizable palm house in 1886. Beginning in 1888, the garden was reorganized to the Eichler system.

In 1969, the university established a new botanical garden, the Botanischer Garten der Universität Tübingen. The old garden was then converted to today's municipal park.

== See also ==
- Botanischer Garten der Universität Tübingen
- D. T. Macdougal: Botanic Gardens II. Tübingen and its Botanists
- List of botanical gardens in Germany
