= Freezing point depression osmometer =

Variety of osmometers

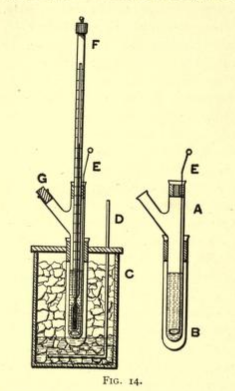
- Freezing point depression
- Classification: Osmolarity, Analytical chemistry
- Analytes: A phenomenon caused by solutes that can measure with this technique

The freezing point depression osmometer is an osmometer that is used in determining a solution's osmotic concentration as its osmotically active aspects depress its freezing point.

In the past, freezing point osmometry has been used to assess the osmotic strength of colloids and solutions. The osmometer uses the solution's freezing point depression to establish its strength. It is also used to determine the level of osmotically appropriate body fluid in various chemicals dissolved in the blood using the relationship in which a mole of dissolved substance reduces the freezing point of a kilogram of water by 1.86 °C (3.35 °F). The freezing point depression osmometer is also used in various medical practices, including pharmaceutical manufacturing, quality control laboratories, and clinical chemistry.

== Method ==
Freezing point depression osmometers are utilized to determine a solution's osmotic strength. It is the approach that is most frequently used for a variety of medical tasks. It is used in assessing the osmotic strength of colloids as well as solutions.

The freezing point depression osmometer operates by using the solution's freezing point to determine the concentration of the solution. It uses e.g. a nanoliter osmometer, a device that facilitates the establishment of the solution's melting and freezing points. Calibration, loading, deep freezing, and determination are the four separate procedures involved in determining the freezing and melting points. The concentration of the solution can be determined by knowing the number of particles present in it, which can be done by determining the freezing point of the solution.

When particles are dissolved in a solution, their freezing point is lowered compared to that of the original solvent. A further increase in the solute decreases the freezing point even further. The freezing point depression osmometer uses the solution's freezing point to establish its concentration. The freezing point depression osmometer is calibrated using standards that are within the solution's osmolality range.

Freezing point depression
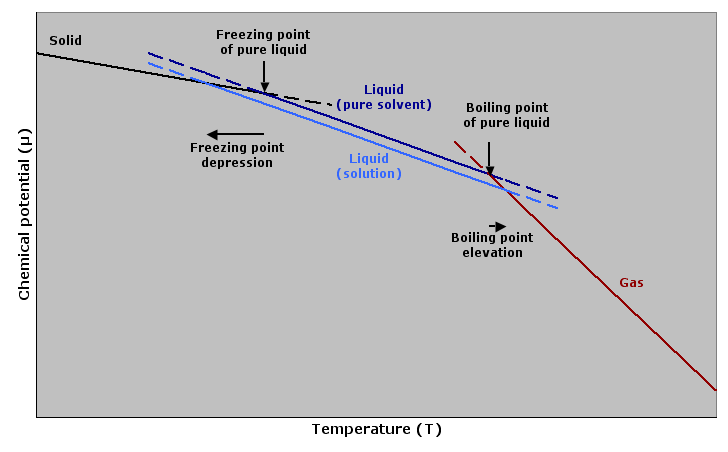
- Freezing point Principle graph of chemical potential against temperature explaining freezing point depression and boiling point elevation
- Manufacturers: Tomas er

Other techniques
- Related: Melting-point depression, Boiling-point elevation

== History of use ==
The use of osmometers began in the late nineteenth century after Van't Hoff won a Nobel Prize for his research and discovery that the relationship between the osmotic pressure of dilute colloid solutions and concentration was consistent with the ideal gas law. Since then, osmometers have been used to measure the osmotic strength of a diluted solution at different levels of concentration.

One of the earliest uses of the method was in an analytical study, in which the urine osmolality of 1,991 dogs was tested. The study established its advantages over other conventional concentration osmometers which rely on the osmotic pressure profile and it was found to be ideal for dilute, biological samples.

== Current usage in medical fields ==
Freezing point depression osmometers are applied in various areas of the medical field. The approach is used in determining the colloidal aspects of solutions. In the present day, the method is applied, among other areas, in measuring osmolarity in lens care solutions as well as eye drops. It is further used in clinical chemistry, pharmaceutical, and quality control laboratories, where it facilitates different processes. As compared to the other methods, the freezing point depression osmometer has a high level of precision and accuracy, making its application in clinical practices safe. It is applied in various processes that involve the manufacturing of drugs. Urine osmolality is also used to measure urine concentration accurately and thus determine renal function and body fluid homeostasis.

== Evaluation of its use ==
Osmometry is widely used in pharmaceuticals, quality control laboratories, and clinical chemistry to measure the osmolality in aqueous solutions accurately. It is commonly used in medical clinics to assist with various pharmaceutical practices, including the development of lens care solutions and eye drops.

== Alternatives ==
Alternative osmometer methods include membrane osmometry, which determines the osmotic pressure of solutions, and vapor pressure osmometry, which assesses the concentration of particles that minimize a solution's vapor pressure and melting, as well as the freezing points of aqueous solutions.

== See also ==
- Melting-point depression
- Boiling-point elevation
- Colligative properties
