= Pfeffer cell =

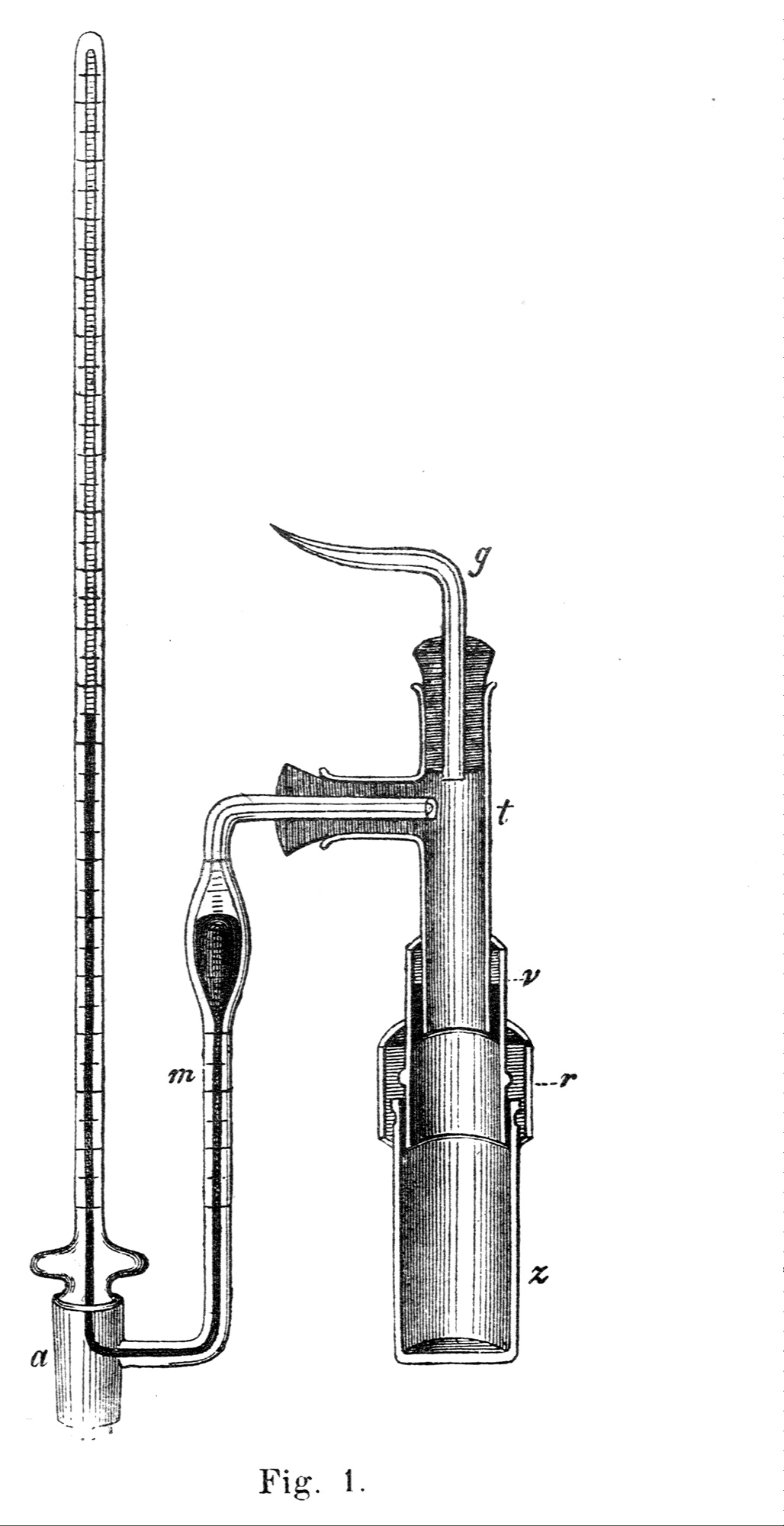
Pfeffer cell apparatus from Osmotische Untersuchungen (p. 5), illustrating the manometer (m), clay cell (z), connecting glass pieces (v, t), and glass ring (r)

Pfeffer cell (German: Pfeffersche Zelle) is a membrane osmometer developed by the German botanist Wilhelm Pfeffer to measure the osmotic pressure of aqueous solutions. Pfeffer described the design in his 1877 publication Osmotische Untersuchungen. The device is no longer used in practice, having been replaced by osmometers of different designs.

== Construction and operation ==
The apparatus consists of an unglazed clay vessel integrated with a chemical precipitate. The design features specific structural elements including a clay vessel, which is a porous ceramic container providing mechanical stabilization against high physical pressures; a precipitation membrane consisting of a colloidal film deposited within the ceramic pores that functions as a semipermeable membrane, allowing the diffusion of water while blocking solutes such as sugars or salts; and a measuring tube formed of a glass tube extended through a sealing stopper to register fluid column height, or linked directly to a manometer.

Pfeffer synthesized the internal semipermeable membrane using a multi-step chemical deposition process where the clay vessel is filled with or submerged in an aqueous solution of copper(II) sulfate, and the vessel is subsequently treated with a solution of potassium hexacyanoferrate(II), also known as yellow prussiate of potash. The chemical interaction at the boundary layer forms a stable precipitate of copper(II) hexacyanoferrate(II) within the porous walls. Pfeffer also experimented with alternative chemical membranes, including Prussian blue, calcium phosphate, iron phosphate, and Iron(III) oxide-hydroxide.

To operate the device, the technician filled the prepared cell with the sample solution, sealed the opening with a stopper containing the glass tube, and submerged the assembly into a larger vessel filled with pure water. Solvent molecules diffuse via osmosis into the cell, increasing the internal volume and causing the liquid level to rise within the vertical tube. This process continues until the generated hydrostatic pressure, which is the pressure exerted by the fluid column at equilibrium due to gravity, equals the osmotic pressure of the initial solution. Pfeffer monitored these pressure differentials directly using a two-legged closed-air manometer connected to the clay cell.

== Significance ==
=== Measurement of osmotic pressure ===
Data plot from Pfeffer's original measurements of sucrose solutions, which served as the empirical basis for van 't Hoff's thermodynamic laws

The Pfeffer cell provided the first method for the precise quantitative measurement of osmotic pressure. Prior experimentalists, such as Moritz Traube, utilized unsupported precipitation membranes attached to glass tubes, which lacked mechanical reinforcement and collapsed under low pressure gradients.

The experimental data generated by the apparatus influenced subsequent theoretical developments. The Dutch chemist Jacobus Henricus van 't Hoff utilized Pfeffer's precise measurement series in 1887 to establish his thermodynamic theory drawing a direct analogy between gas pressure and the osmotic pressure of dilute solutions. The American chemist Harmon Northrop Morse refined the preparation methodology by developing an electrolytic deposition process to apply the membranes uniformly, validating and extending van 't Hoff's laws at higher pressures.

The apparatus is no longer employed in modern laboratory osmometry because the chemical synthesis of the membrane requires precise maintenance, and the membrane-forming electrolytes must remain present in the testing solutions to maintain structural integrity.

=== Osmotic model of the plant cell ===
Pfeffer designed the apparatus to mimic the biophysical properties of a living plant cell, where the semipermeable plasma membrane is physically supported by a rigid outer cell wall. In this mechanical analogue, the precipitation membrane represents the cellular plasma membrane or protoplast boundary, and the porous clay vessel represents the rigid cell wall acting as a mechanical counter-pressure mechanism.

Pfeffer conducted quantitative experiments to evaluate water flux and pressure relations to analyze the high hydrostatic forces, or turgor pressure, observed within living vegetable tissues. The apparatus remains a classic instructional tool in plant physiology to demonstrate the mechanics of water potential.

== Sources ==
- Morse, Harmon Northrop (1914). The Osmotic Pressure of Aqueous Solutions: Report on Investigations Made in the Chemical Laboratory of the Johns Hopkins University During the Years 1899–1913. Washington: Carnegie Institution of Washington.
- Pfeffer, Wilhelm (1921). Osmotische Untersuchungen: Studien zur Zellmechanik (2nd ed.). Leipzig: Wilhelm Engelmann.
- Sitte, P.; Weiler, E. W.; Kadereit, J. W.; Bresinsky, A. (2002). Strasburger – Lehrbuch der Botanik (35th ed.). Heidelberg: Spektrum Gustav Fischer. ISBN 3-8274-1010-X.
- van 't Hoff, J. H. (1887). "The role of osmotic pressure in the analogy between solution and gases". Zeitschrift für Physikalische Chemie. 1: 481–508.
