= Urine osmolality =

Measure of urine concentration

Urine osmolality is a measure of urine concentration, in which large values indicate concentrated urine and small values indicate diluted urine. Consumption of water (including water contained in food) affects the osmolality of urine.

== Overview ==
Osmolality is measured by osmometer, which evaluates the freezing point depression of a solution and supplies results as milliosmoles per kilogram of water while specific gravity is measured by colorimetric strips, refractometer, hydrometer and pyknometer. In healthy humans with restricted fluid intake, urine osmolality should be greater than 800 mOsm/kg, while a 24-hour urine osmolality should average between 500 and 800 mOsm/kg.

Urine osmolality in humans can range from approximately 50 to 1200 mOsm/kg, depending on whether the person has recently drunk a large quantity of water (the lower number) or has gone without water for a long time (the higher number). Plasma osmolality with typical fluid intake often averages approximately 290 mOsm/kg H_{2}O in humans.

== In other animals ==
Some mammals are capable of higher osmolality than humans. This includes rats (approximately 3,000 mOsm/kg H_{2}O), hamsters and mice (approximately 4,000 mOsm/kg H_{2}O), and chinchillas (approximately 7,600 mOsm/kg H_{2}O)

== See also ==
- Plasma osmolality
