= Botanischer Garten der Universität Tübingen =

University botanical garden Garden in Germany

Coordinates: 48.5395°N 9.0359°E

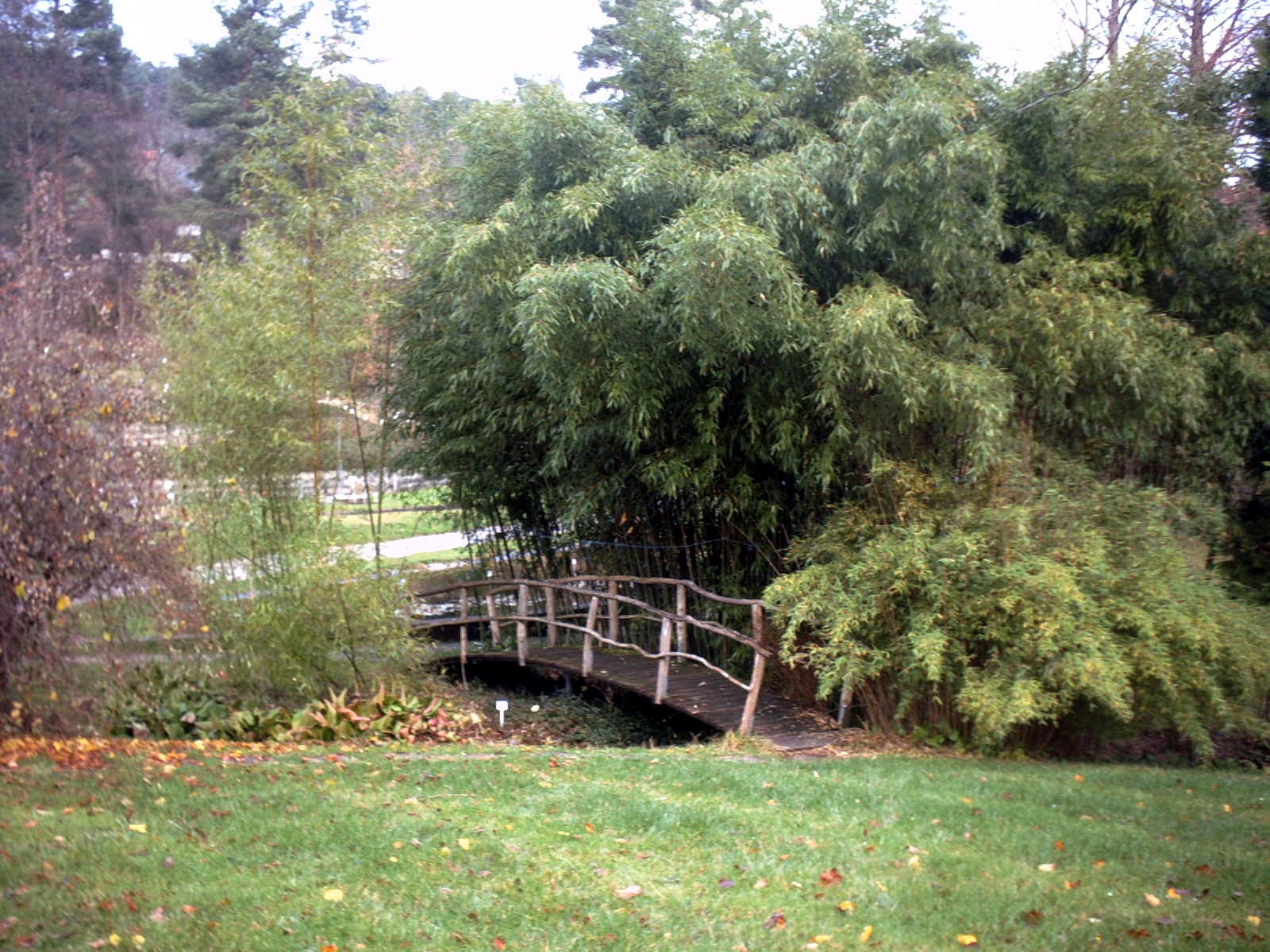
Botanischer Garten der Universität Tübingen

The Botanischer Garten der Universität Tübingen, also known as the Botanischer Garten Tübingen or the Neuer Botanischer Garten Tübingen, is a botanical garden and arboretum maintained by the University of Tübingen. It is located at Hartmeyerstrasse 123, Tübingen, Baden-Württemberg, Germany, and open daily.

The garden traces back to 1535 when medicinal plants were first grown by Leonhart Fuchs (1501-1566). In 1663 a Hortus Medicus was created by direction of Eberhard III, Duke of Württemberg (1614–74), with university gardener appointed in 1666. In 1681 Georg Balthasar Metzger (1623-1687) was named director, followed in 1688 by Rudolph Jacob Camerarius (1655-1721). The first greenhouse was completed in 1744, and noted botanist Johann Georg Gmelin (1709-1755) appointed director in 1751.

In 1804 a new garden was established by decree of King Frederick of Württemberg (1754-1816) under the leadership of Professor Carl Friedrich Kielmeyer (1765-1844), which grew and flourished throughout the first half of the nineteenth century. By 1809 it contained four greenhouses and a lecture hall, with its first seed catalog published in 1820, and from 1818-1825 its plants were reorganized according to the system of Antoine Laurent de Jussieu. In 1846 a substantial institute building was completed and by 1859 the garden cultivated 5,226 species. In 1866 the garden's final expansion was made with the purchase of adjacent private land. In 1878 Wilhelm Pfeffer (1845-1920) became director, who inaugurated a sizable palm house in 1886. Beginning in 1888, the garden was reorganized to the Eichler system.

Today's new botanical garden opened in 1969 with its first arboretum planting in the same year. In the mid 1970s the greenhouses were built, with a grass garden added in 1978-1979 and areas for plants of the Swiss and the Franconian Jura added in 1984. The alpine garden was expanded and reworked in the mid 1980s, with the Canary Island house added in 1987. In 1996 the Foerderkreis Botanical Garden was founded, and in 2000 a new medicinal plant department added. Today the garden contains more than 12,000 plant species, including major collections of Fuchsia (30 varieties) and Rhododendrons (150-180 varieties). The fuchsias are gathered in a glass and steel pavilion, built in 2001 for the 500th anniversary of the birth of Leonhart Fuchs.

== Collections ==
- Alpinum and Alpine house - collections of mountain plants organized in ecological and geographical areas, with excellent collections from Europe, Africa, Asia, North and South America, Australia / New Zealand, and Antarctica, as well as extensive collections from the Alps organized by ecology.
- Arboretum (5 hectares) - more than 1000 taxa of woody plants, including the Pomarium (a collection of Swabian apple varieties).
- Asia - plants from the Himalayas, with fine collections of rhododendrons and evergreen trees such as Cedrus deodara and Pinus wallichiana; from Eastern Asia, including a relatively complete representation of Chinese rhododendrons, various maples (Acer spp.), kiwi (Actinidia), dogwood (Cornus spp.), and several specimens of Metasequoia glyptostroboides; and the Johann Georg Gmelin Siberian Department, currently under construction, which will contain representative flowering plants from Siberia.
- Cottage garden - plants from a Swabian peasant's garden, including useful and ornamental plants.
- Ecological area - two rows of hardy aquatic plants, and selected species grouped by ecological adaptations, such as monoecious and dioecious flowers, dune plants, lianas, rhizomes, salt plants, root climbers, xerophytes, etc.
- Japan - a Japanese garden with pond, including Alnus japonica, Cercidiphyllum japonicum, Cornus controversa, Cryptomeria japonica, Magnolia stellata, Taxus cuspidata, Salix sachalinensis, Sciadopitys verticillata, and Thujopsis dolabrata, as well as Japanese azaleas, Rhododendron species, Enkianthus, and Erica.
- Jura - plants of the Jura Mountains.
- Medicinal plants - a new medicinal herb garden reflecting interests of today's pharmaceutical industry.
- North America - woods and small trees of North America, including Calocedrus decurrens, Liriodendron tulipifera, Sequoiadendron giganteum, and Taxodium distichum.
- Ornamentals - ornamental plantings including varieties from East Asia and North America.
- Pannonikum - plants from the Pannonikum region stretching from lower Austria to the Black Sea, including Carex humilis, Lathyrus pannonicus, Onosma visianii, Prunus fruticosa, Quercus pubescens, and Stipa capillata.
- Swabian collection - plants from Swabia's steppe and heath forests, meadows, mixed deciduous forest, secondary juniper bushes, and rock formations of the White Jura.
- Systematic area - a representative sample of families of angiosperms (Angiospermae), first organized in 1974 by the system of Cronquist and Takhtajan, with significant changes made in 2000-2001 to reflect molecular phylogenetic hypotheses for the evolution of angiosperms. The current system now largely reflects the views of the Angiosperm Phylogeny Group (APG 2003).
- Vineyards - many vine varieties representing old and new techniques of vine care from the Württemberg wine region.

== See also ==
- Alter Botanischer Garten Tübingen
- List of botanical gardens in Germany
