= Vapor pressure osmometry =

Method of determining a polymer's average molecular weight

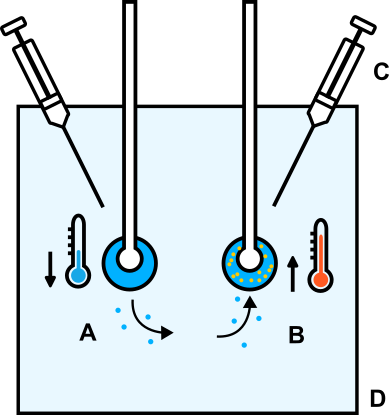
Schematic of a vapour pressure omsometer. Two thermocouples (precise temperature monitors) hold a droplet of pure water and a droplet of the sample to be measured respectively.A. water evaporates from the pure water droplet until vapour pressure equals the vapour pressure of the pure water, cooling as it does (evaporation is endothermic)B. the sample droplet, containing osmotically active solute and so with lower vapour pressure that the pure water, condenses some of the water vapour, increasing its temperature (condensation is exothermic). An equilibrium is reached where the cooler pure water has the same vapour pressure as the warmer sample C. injector used to introduce sample/pure waterD. closed chamber.

In polymer chemistry, vapor phase osmometry (VPO), also known as vapor-pressure osmometry, is an experimental technique for the determination of a polymer's number average molecular weight, M_{n}. It works by taking advantage of the decrease in vapor pressure that occurs when solutes are added to pure solvent. This technique can be used for polymers with a molecular weight of up to 20,000 though accuracy is best for those below 10,000. Although membrane osmometry is also based on the measurement of colligative properties, it has a lower bound of 25,000 for sample molecular weight that can be measured owing to problems with membrane permeation.

== Experiment ==
A typical vapor phase osmometer consists of: (1) two thermistors, one with a polymer-solvent solution droplet adhered to it and another with a pure solvent droplet adhered to it; (2) a thermostatted chamber with an interior saturated with solvent vapor; (3) a liquid solvent vessel in the chamber; and (4) an electric circuit to measure the bridge output imbalance difference between the two thermistors. The voltage difference is an accurate way of measuring the temperature difference between the two thermistors, which is a consequence of solvent vapor condensing on the solution droplet (the solution droplet has a lower vapor pressure than the solvent).

== M_{n} Calculation and Calibration ==
The number average molecular weight for a polymer sample is given by the following equation:

$$M_n = K / ( \lim_{c \to 0}(\Delta V/c) )$$

where:
$K$ is a calibration constant,
$\Delta V$ is the bridge imbalance output voltage,
$c$ is the polymer-solvent solution concentration

It is necessary to calibrate a vapor phase osmometer and K is found for a particular solvent, operational temperature, and type of commercial apparatus. A calibration can be carried out using a standard of known molecular weight. Some possible solvents for VPO include toluene, tetrahydrofuran, or chloroform. Once the experiment is performed, concentration and output voltage data can be graphed on a plot of (ΔV/c) versus c. The plot can be extrapolated to the y-axis in order to obtain the limit of (ΔV/c) as c approaches zero. The equation above can then be used to calculate K.

== Alternatives ==
Vapor phase osmometry is well suited for the analysis of oligomers and short polymers while higher polymers can be analyzed using other techniques such as membrane osmometry and light scattering. As of 2008, VPO faces competition from matrix-assisted laser desorption ionisation mass spectrometry (MALDI-MS), but VPO still has some advantages when fragmentation of samples for mass spectrometry may be problematic.
