= Harmon Northrop Morse =

American chemist

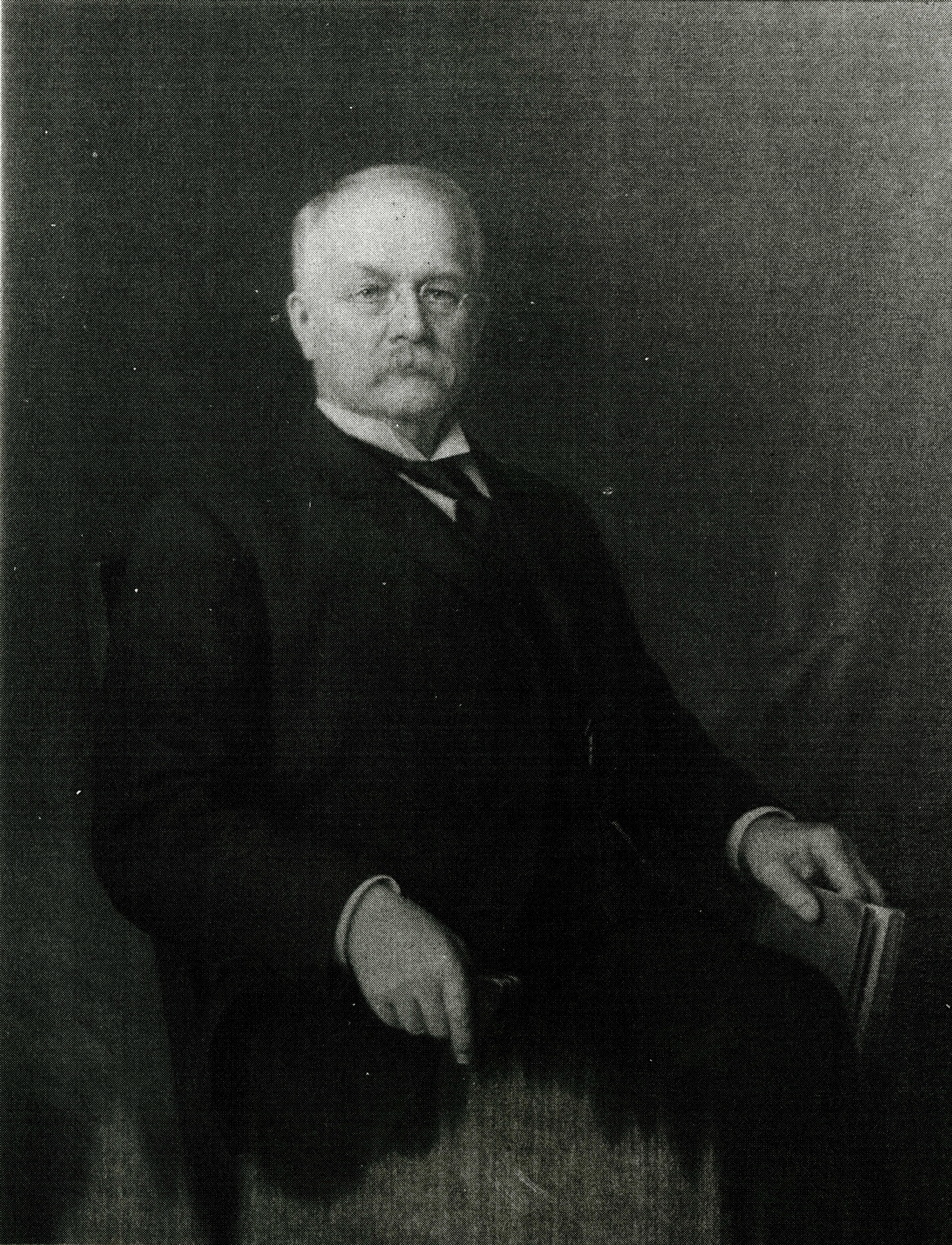
- Born: October 15, 1848; Cambridge, Vermont
- Died: September 8, 1920 (aged 71); Chebeague, Maine
- Education: University of Göttingen
- Occupation: Chemist
- Known for: synthesis of paracetamol
- Scientific career
- Workplaces: Johns Hopkins University

Harmon Northrop Morse (October 15, 1848 – September 8, 1920) was an American chemist. Today he is known as the first to have synthesized paracetamol, but this substance only became widely used as a drug decades after Morse's death. In the first half of the 20th century he was best known for his study of osmotic pressure, for which he was awarded the Avogadro Medal in 1916. The Morse equation for estimating osmotic pressure is named after him.

== Life and career ==
The earliest American ancestor of Harmon Northrop Morse was John Morse, who came from England in 1639 and settled in New Haven. His father, Harmon Morse, was a Puritan farmer and a believer in hard work, few holidays and little schooling. He viewed all forms of recreation as objectionable. Northrop's mother died at a young age, leaving behind Northrop, his brother Anson and his sister Delia.

Thanks to an endowment left by his grandmother, Northrop Morse studied chemistry at Amherst College, which he entered in 1869 and graduated in 1873. He continued his studies in Germany, and obtained a PhD in chemistry with a minor in mineralogy from the University of Göttingen in 1875. During Morse's time there, Friedrich Wöhler had officially retired from active service, and Morse's thesis adviser, and head of the Laboratory, was Hans Hübner. Nevertheless, Wöhler occasionally spent part of his time in the laboratory and a few favored students, generally Americans, were given the privilege of working with him. Hübner was an organic chemist, so Morse's initial work was in that area, but later Morse would work in what is now known as physical chemistry.

Morse returned to the United States in 1875, and was given an assistantship at Amherst. There he worked for a year under Harris and Emerson. When Johns Hopkins University opened in 1876, Morse moved there as an associate of Ira Remsen, thanks in part to a letter of recommendation from Emerson. Remsen and Morse started the chemistry laboratory at Johns Hopkins together, and Morse's experience from Germany proved very valuable, as the American chemistry school was less developed at the time. Morse officially became an associate professor in 1883, a full professor of inorganic and analytical chemistry in 1892, and director of the chemical laboratory in 1908. He retired in 1916.

Morse was elected to the American Philosophical Society in 1903, the United States National Academy of Sciences in 1907, and the American Academy of Arts and Sciences in 1914.

Morse married twice and had four children—a daughter and three sons. His, second wife, Elizabet Dennis Clark, helped him in preparing articles for publication. After his retirement, Morse became quite reclusive, seldom left his house and his health deteriorated. He died during his annual vacation in Chebeague Island, Maine—a place he often visited. He was buried at Amherst, where he also had a summer house. In his obituary, Remsen remembers Morse as "quiet and uneffusive".

== Scientific legacy ==
Although Johns Hopkins was a research university from the beginning, the early years of the chemistry department were marked by a lack of students and equipment. Morse was initially discouraged and spent most of his time teaching. Around the turn of the century Morse published a series of papers on the preparation of permanganic acid. This led him to study osmotic pressure. In the first half of the 20th century, the Morse name was mainly associated with his work in this area. With the help of a grant from the Carnegie Institution of Washington, he published a report entitled The Osmotic Pressure of Aqueous Solutions, which summarized the work he performed between 1899 and 1913. For this work he was awarded the Avogadro Medal by the Academy of Sciences of Turin (Accademia delle Scienze di Torino)—the Piedmontese academy of which Avogadro was member. The medal was a unique prize awarded on the centennial anniversary of Avogadro's law.

In 1887 Jacobus Henricus van 't Hoff published his landmark paper regarding the analogy between gas pressure and the osmotic pressure of solutions, for which he won the first Nobel Prize in Chemistry. He derived an analogue of Gay-Lussac's law for the dependence of the osmotic pressure on absolute temperature. Van 't Hoff derived his analogy based on data from experiments that Wilhelm Pfeffer, a professor of botany, had published a decade earlier under the title "Osmotische Untersuchungen" — an account of his endeavors to measure osmotic pressure by means of porous cells lined with a semipermeable membrane consisting of copper(II)-hexacyanoferrate(II). After van 't Hoff's theory was published, experimenters had trouble to replicate Pfeffer's measurements, mainly because they could not find or make clay cells of suitable quality to support the semipermeable membrane, a problem that had affected Pfeffer as well. Furthermore, Morse showed that Pfeffer's cells were leaky at high pressure. Morse's main experimental contribution was an electrolytic method of depositing semi-permeable membranes. This technological advancement made possible the verification and correction of van 't Hoff's theory.

In a modern formulation, van 't Hoff's equation states that ΠV = nRT, where Π is the osmotic pressure, V is the volume of the solution, n is the number of moles of the solute, R is the gas constant, and T is the absolute temperature (compare with the ideal gas law). This equation can also be written as Π = cRT, where c = n/V is the molarity (mol/m^{3}) of the solution. Morse showed experimentally that Π = bRT, where b is the molality (mol/kg) yields a better approximation of osmotic pressure. This latter equation is named after him. Using these equations one can calculate the molar mass of solutes from the osmotic pressure data.
