= Elias Rudolph Camerarius Sr. =

German physician (1641–1695)

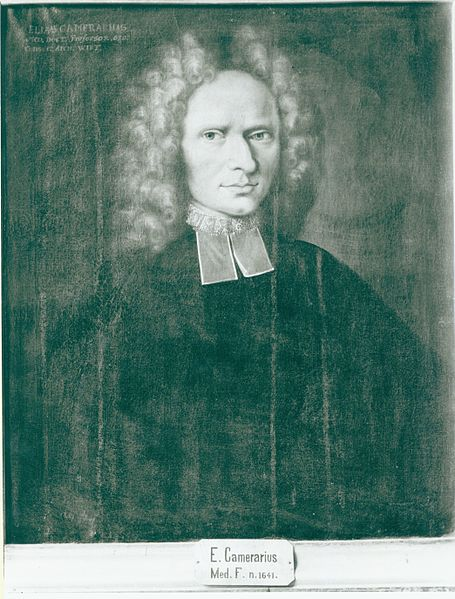
- Camerarius c. 1690
- Born: May 7, 1641; Tübingen
- Died: June 7, 1695 (aged 54); Tübingen
- Education: University of Tübingen
- Scientific career
- Fields: Physician
- Workplaces: University of Tübingen
- Doctoral advisor: Georg Balthasar Metzger
- Doctoral students: Rudolf Jakob Camerarius

Elias Rudolph Camerarius Sr. (May 7, 1641 – June 7, 1695) was a professor of medicine who notably wrote books on the palpitations of the heart, pleurisy, skull fractures, and the use of medicinal plants.

He obtained his Doctor of Medicine in 1663 at the University of Tübingen. He is the father of Elias Rudolph Camerarius Jr. and Rudolf Jakob Camerarius.
