= Osmometer =

Device for measuring the osmotic strength of a solution, colloid, or compound

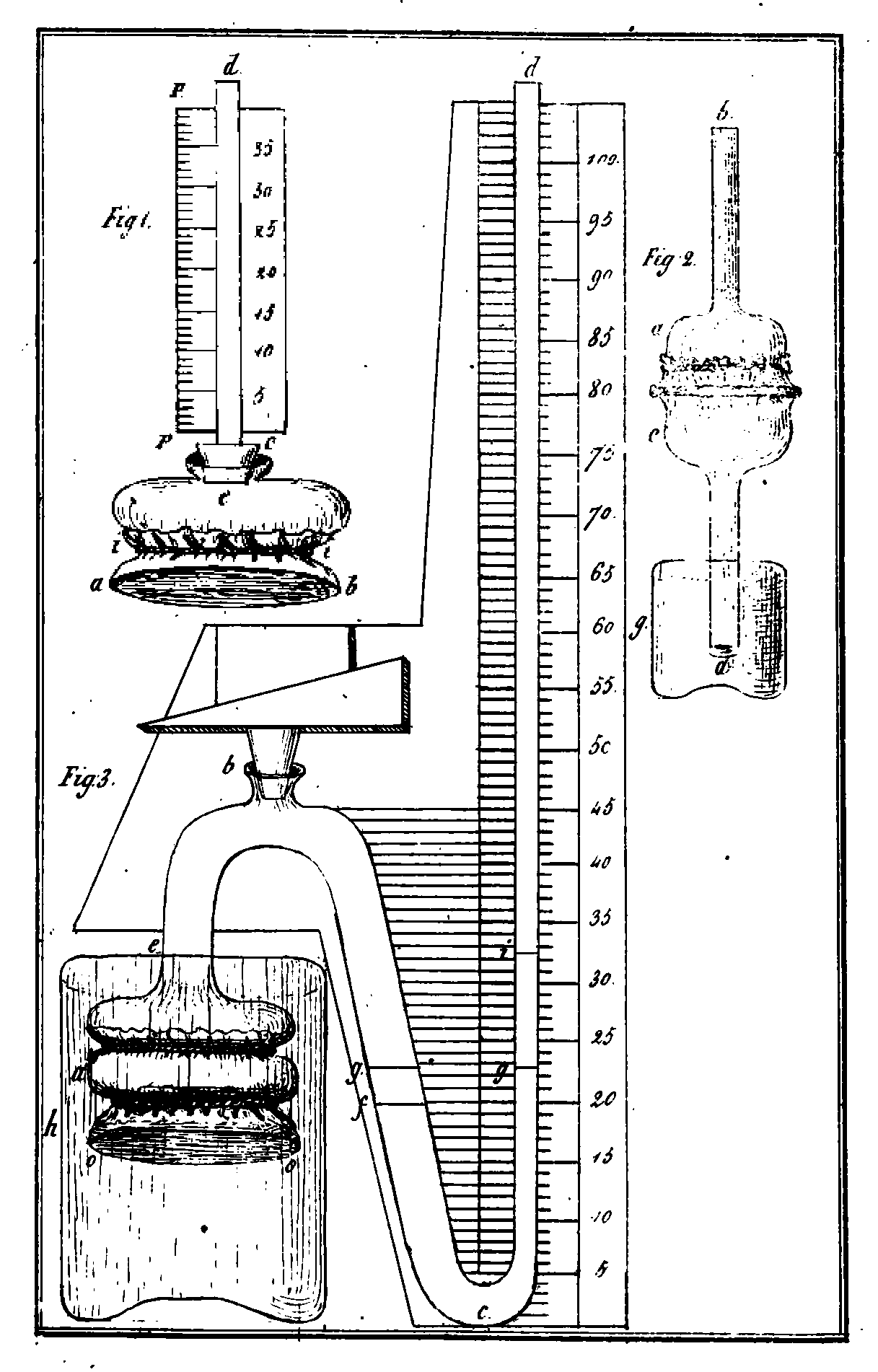
Illustration of the endosmometer developed by Henri Dutrochet, from Nouvelles recherches sur l’endosmose et l’exosmose, Paris, 1828

An osmometer is a device for measuring the osmotic strength of a solution, colloid, or compound.

There are several different techniques employed in osmometry:

- Freezing point depression osmometers may also be used to determine the osmotic strength of a solution, as osmotically active compounds depress the freezing point of a solution. This is the most common method in clinical laboratories because it is the most accurate and simple method.
- Vapor pressure osmometers determine the concentration of osmotically active particles that reduce the vapor pressure of a solution.
- Membrane osmometers measure the osmotic pressure of a solution separated from pure solvent by a semipermeable membrane. Historically, the early osmometer (Pfeffer cell, 1877), belonged to the membrane type.

Osmometers are useful for determining the total concentration of dissolved salts and sugars in blood or urine samples. Osmometry is also useful in determining the molecular weight of unknown compounds and polymers.

Osmometry is the measurement of the osmotic strength of a substance. This is often used by chemists for the determination of average molecular weight.

Osmometry is also useful for estimating the drought tolerance of plant leaves.

== See also ==
- Clifton nanolitre osmometer, an example of a freezing point depression osmometer.

== Sources ==
- Johnson, Daniel; Hashaikeh, Raed; Hilal, Nidal (2021). "Basic principles of osmosis and osmotic pressure". In Hilal, Nidal; Ismail, Ahmad Fauzi; Khayet, Mohamed; Johnson, Daniel (eds.). Osmosis Engineering. Elsevier. pp. 1–15. doi:10.1016/B978-0-12-821016-1.00011-5. ISBN 978-0-12-821016-1.
