= Wilhelm Pfeffer =

German botanist and plant physiologist (1845-1920)

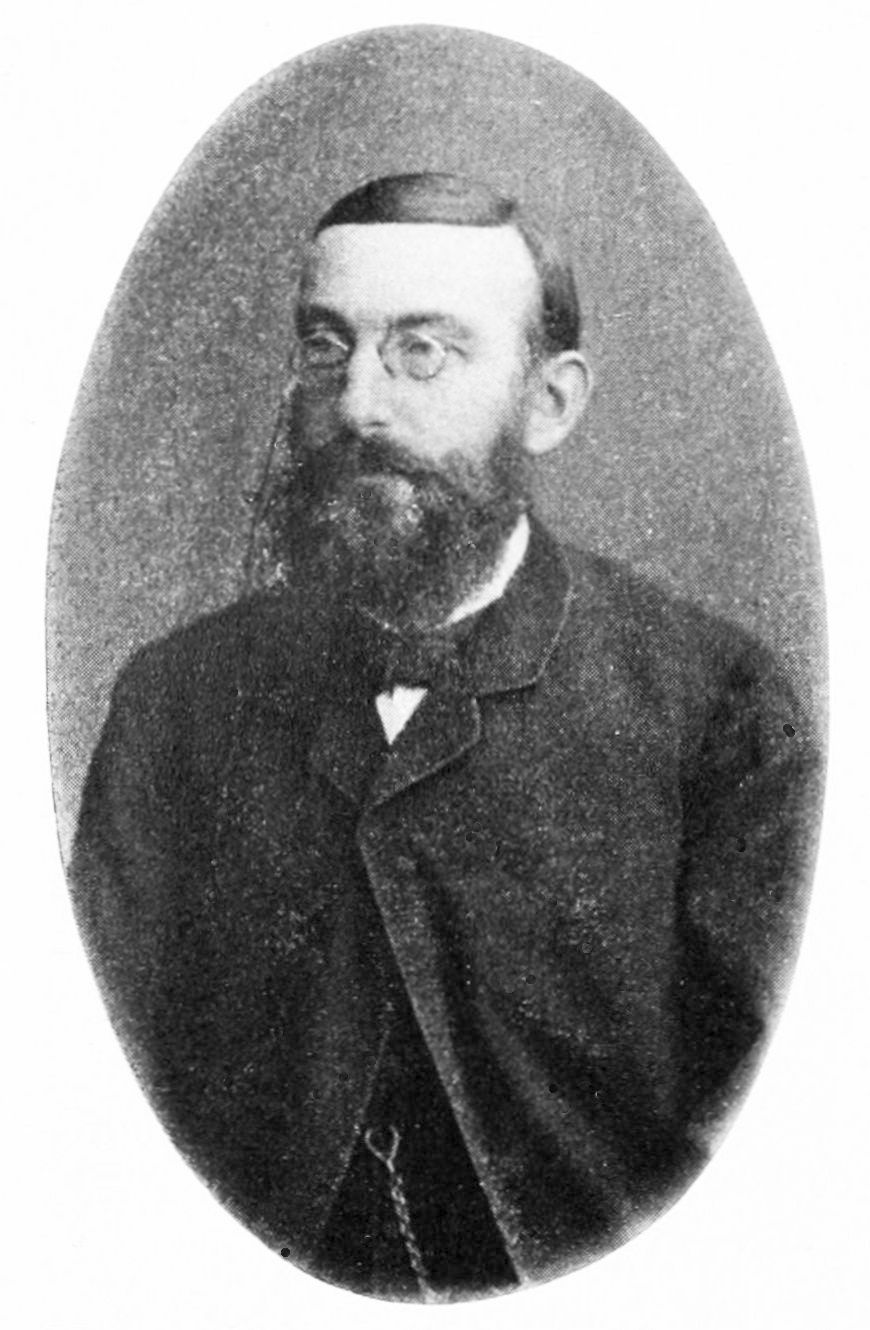
Wilhelm Pfeffer (1845-1920)

Wilhelm Friedrich Philipp Pfeffer (9 March 1845 – 31 January 1920) was a German botanist and plant physiologist born in Grebenstein.

== Academic career ==
He studied chemistry and pharmacy at the University of Göttingen, where his instructors included Friedrich Wöhler (1800-1882), William Eduard Weber (1804-1891) and Wilhelm Rudolph Fittig (1835-1910). Afterwards, he furthered his education at the universities of Marburg and Berlin. At Berlin, he studied under Alexander Braun (1805-1877) and was an assistant to Nathanael Pringsheim (1823-1894). Later on, he served as an assistant to Julius von Sachs (1832-1897) at Würzburg,

In 1873 he was appointed professor of pharmacology and botany at the University of Bonn, followed by professorships at the Universities of Basel (from 1877) and Tübingen (from 1878), where he also served as director of the Botanischer Garten der Universität Tübingen. In 1887 he became a professor at the University of Leipzig and director of its botanical garden.

He was elected to honorary membership of the Manchester Literary and Philosophical Society, in 1894, to membership of the Royal Swedish Academy of Sciences and an International Honorary Member of the American Academy of Arts and Sciences in 1897, an International Member of the United States National Academy of Sciences in 1903, and the American Philosophical Society in 1909.

== Scientific work ==
Pfeffer was a pioneer of modern plant physiology. His scientific interests included the thermonastic and photonastic movements of flowers, the nyctinastic movements of leaves, protoplastic physics and photosynthesis. In 1877, while researching plant metabolism, Pfeffer developed a semi-porous membrane to study the phenomena of osmosis. The eponymous Pfeffer cell is named for the osmometric device he constructed for determining the osmotic pressure of a solution.

During his tenure at Leipzig, Pfeffer published an article on the use of photography to study plant growth. He wanted to extend the chronophotographic experiments of Étienne-Jules Marey (1830-1904) by producing a short film involving the stages of plant growth. This "movie" would be filmed over a period of weeks by frame-at-a-time exposure taken at regular spaced intervals. Later, time-lapse photography would become a commonplace procedure.

Pfeffer cell
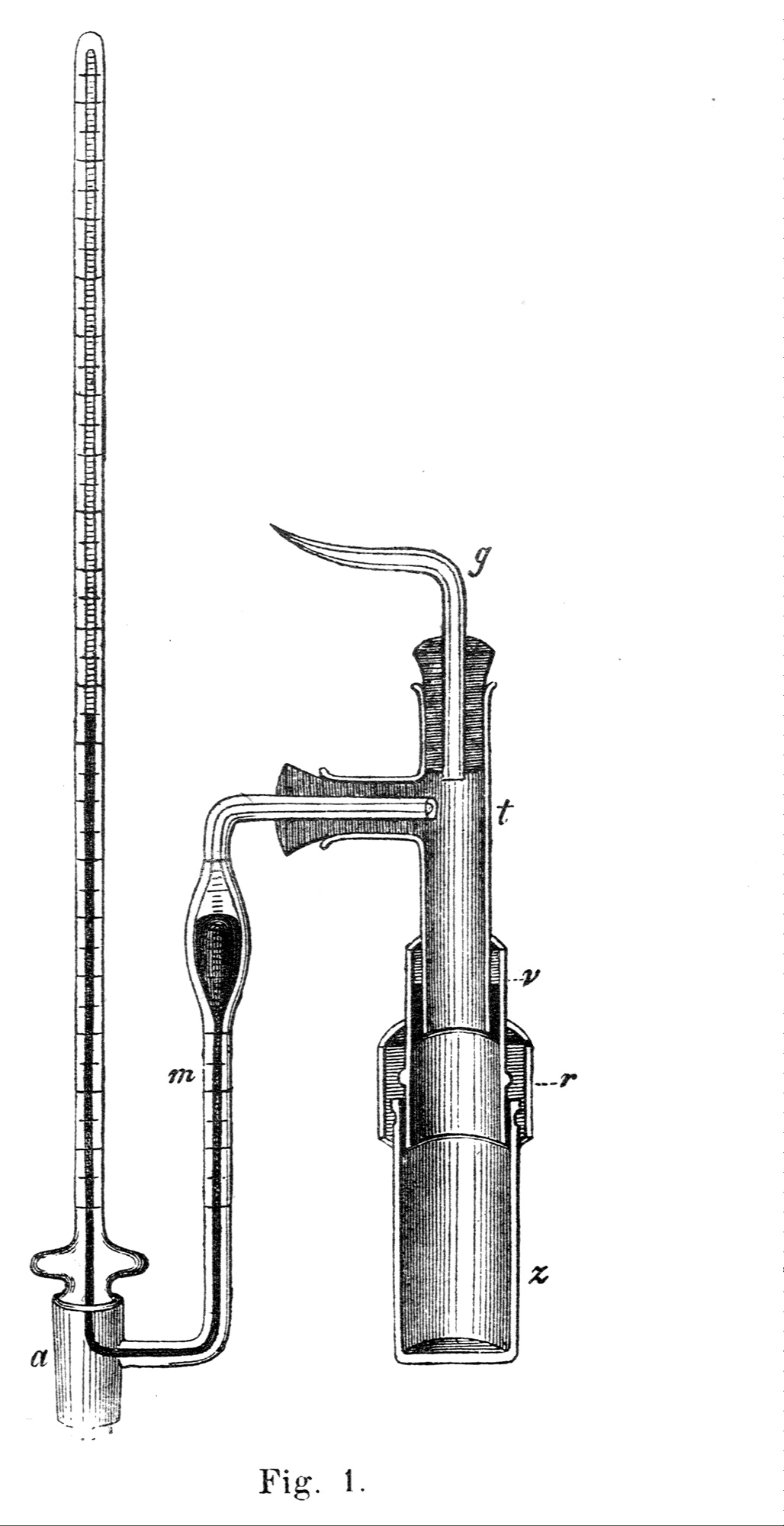
The Pfeffer cell determines the osmotic pressure of a solution.

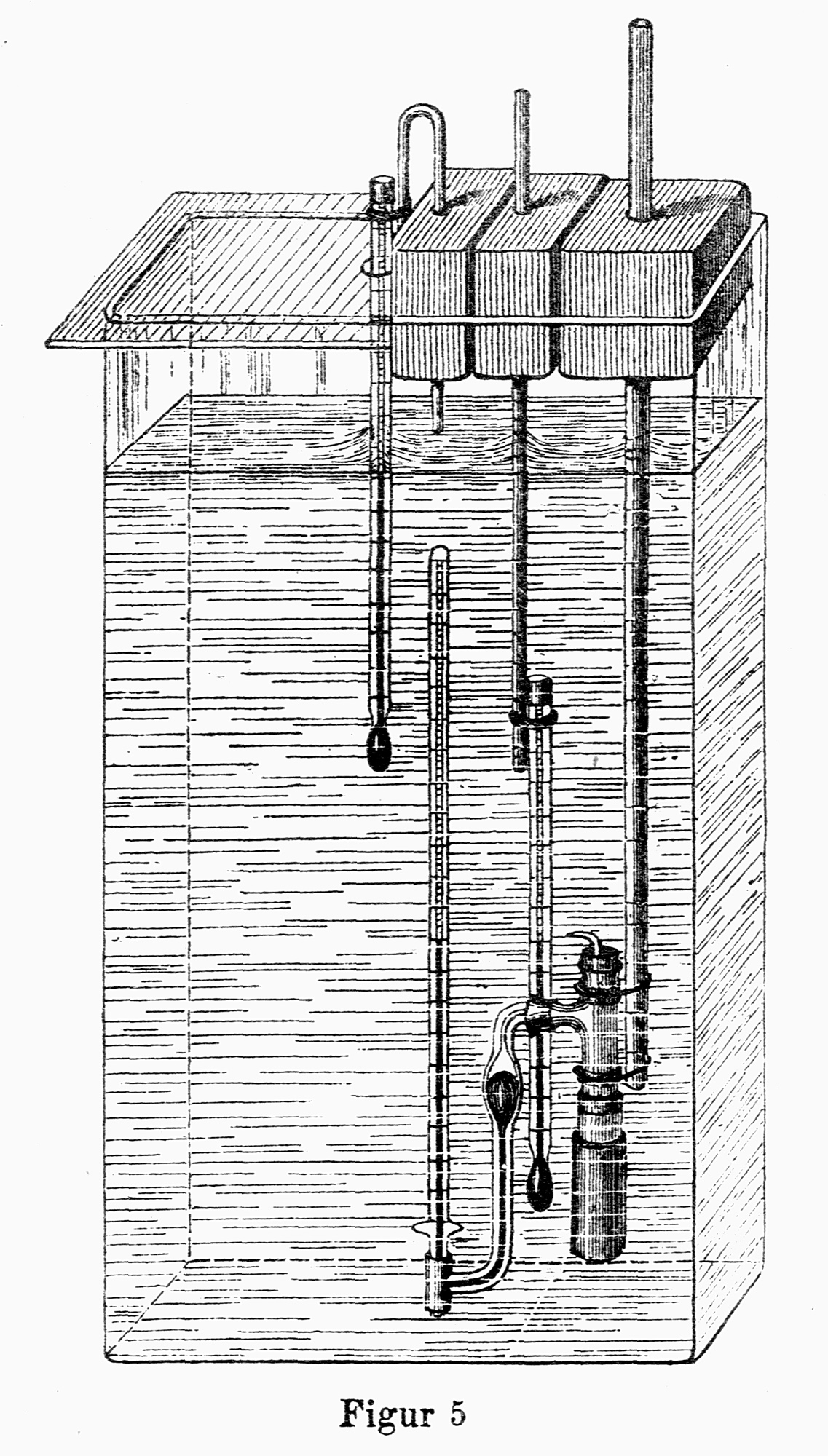
The Pfeffer cell was composed of a porous earthenware container, with a copper ferrocyanide precipitate, connected to a manometer.

Osmotic pressure of dissolved sucrose (german: "Rohrzucker") obtained by Pfeffer (Table 9 from "Osmotische Untersuchungen", 1877)

== Written works ==
- Physiologische Untersuchungen - 1873 (Physiological studies)
- Lehrbuch der Pflanzenphysiologie (Textbook of plant physiology).
- Die periodischen Bewegungen der Blattorgane - 1875 (The periodic movements of "leaf organs")
- Osmotische Untersuchungen – Studien zur Zellmechanik - 1877 (Osmotic studies)
- Beiträge zur Kenntniss der Oxydationsvorgänge in lebenden Zellen - 1889 (Contributions to the knowledge of the oxidative processes in living cells).
- Über Aufnahme und Ausgabe ungelöster Körper - 1890
- Studien zur Energetik der Pflanze - 1892 (Studies on the energetics of plants)
- Druck- und Arbeitsleistung durch wachsende Pflanzen - 1893
- Untersuchungen über die Entstehung der Schlafbewegungen der Blattorgane - 1907
- Der Einfluss von mechanischer Hemmung und von Belastung auf die Schlafbewegung - 1911 (The influence of mechanical stress on the inhibition of sleep and movement).
- Beiträge zur Kenntniss der Entstehung der Schlafbewegungen- 1915 (Contributions to the knowledge on the genesis of sleep movements).
