= Rudolf Jakob Camerarius =

German botanist and physician (1665–1721)

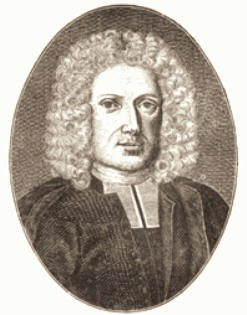
- Born: 12 February 1665; Tübingen, Holy Roman Empire
- Died: 11 September 1721 (aged 56); Tübingen, Holy Roman Empire
- Other name: Camerer
- Known for: Investigations on the reproductive organs of plants (De sexu plantarum epistola)
- Father: Elias Rudolph Camerarius Sr.
- Scientific career
- Fields: Botanist and physician
- Doctoral advisor: Elias Rudolph Camerarius Sr. Georg Balthasar Metzger
- Doctoral students: Johann Andreas Planer

Rudolf Jakob Camerarius or Camerer (12 February 1665 – 11 September 1721) was a German botanist and physician. He is chiefly remembered for realizing that flowers are the reproductive organs of plants.

== Life ==
Camerarius was born at Tübingen, and became professor of medicine and director of the botanical gardens at Tübingen in 1687. He is chiefly known for his investigations on the reproductive organs of plants (De sexu plantarum epistola (1694)).

While other botanists, such as John Ray and Nehemiah Grew, had observed that plants seemed to have sex in some form, and guessed that pollen was the male fertilizing agent, it was Camerarius who did experimental work. In studying the mulberry, he determined that female plants not near to male (staminate) plants produced fruit but with no seeds. Mercurialis and spinach plants fared likewise. With the castor oil plant (Ricinus) and with maize he cut off the staminate flowers (the "tassels" of maize), and likewise observed that no seeds formed. His results were reported in the form of a letter (the epistola), and attracted immediate attention, subsequent workers extending his results from the monoecious plants he had studied to dioecious ones as well.

== Works ==
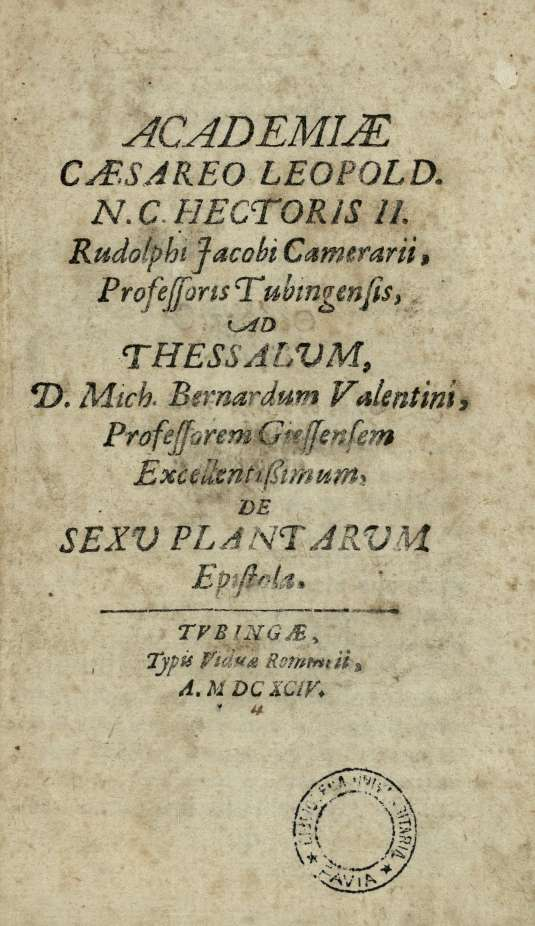
De sexu plantarum, 1694

- De plantis vernis (in Latin). Tübingen: Martin Rommey. 1688.
- De sexu plantarum (in Latin). Tübingen: Martin Rommey. 1694.
