= Matthias Palbitzki =

Swedish diplomat and art-connoisseur (1623-1677)

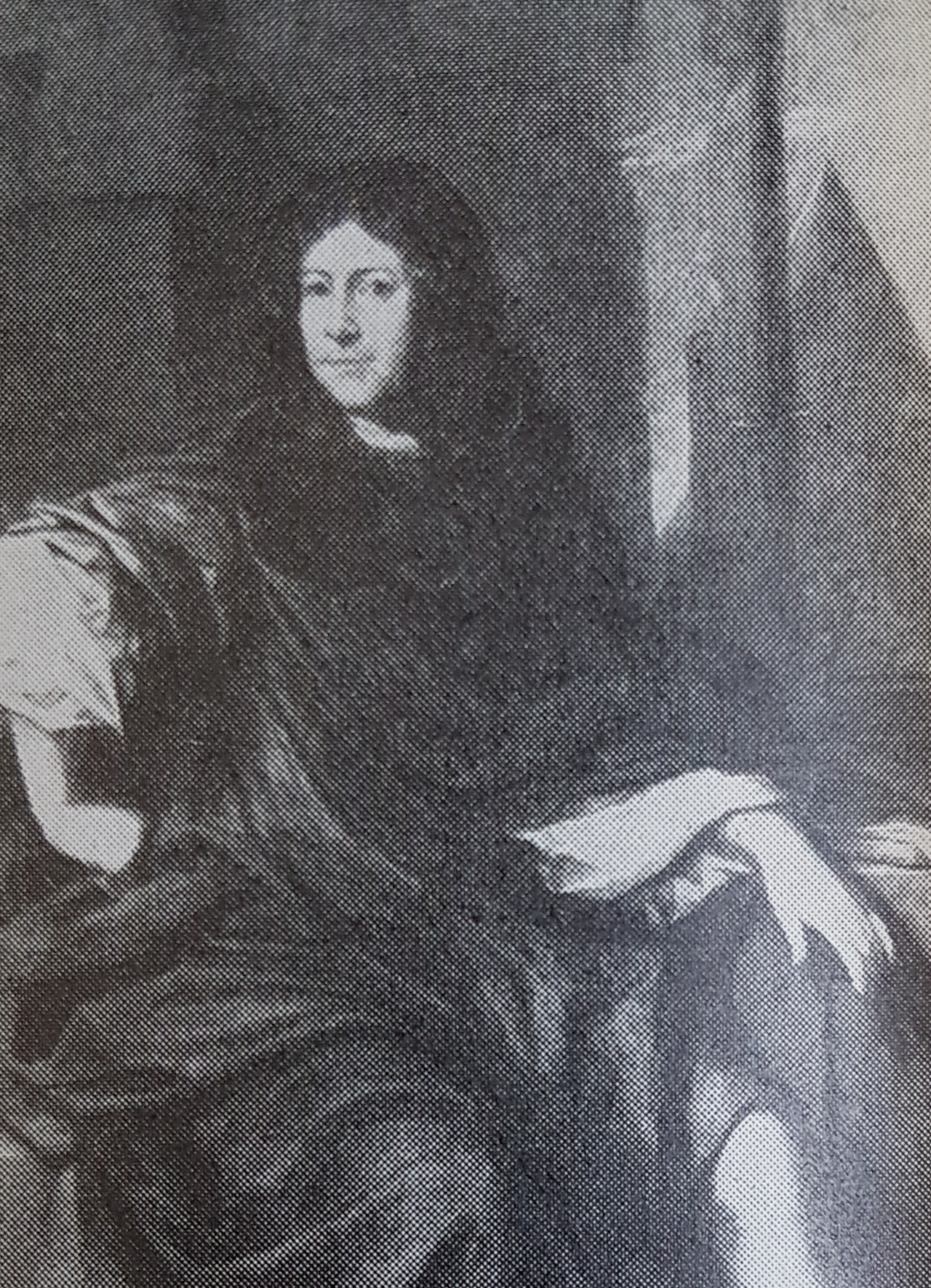
Matthias Palbitzki

Matthias Palbitzki (23 December 1623, 20 October 1677 in Julita, Södermanland) was a Swedish diplomat and art-connoisseur. His diplomatic skills were highly appreciated. In 1675 he was elevated to Swedish baron.

== Life ==
Matthias Palbitzki was probably born in Stolp, where his father Georg Matthias Palbitzki was mayor of a Pomeranian District. From 1630 he was taught by private tutors and attended the 1637 Academic Gymnasium Danzig. Because of the Thirty Years' War in Pomerania, which also impacted the estates of the family, his mother sent him 1640 the Sorø Academy. Together with his brother in 1642, he went on tour to the Dutch Republic or France to enter into military service. Already in Hamburg he met the commander Gustaf Horn, who persuaded him to get in Swedish service, and took him to Stockholm. Matthias Palbitzki became Hofjunker of Christina, Queen of Sweden. In 1643 he was an ensign of the bodyguard and the same year was promoted to lieutenant commander. In 1645 he continued his grand tour through the west and southern Europe, to Egypt, Greece and Constantinople. On the way back he spent almost a year in Rome and then traveled through Switzerland and France to Sweden. Upon his return in October 1648 he was appointed chamberlain.

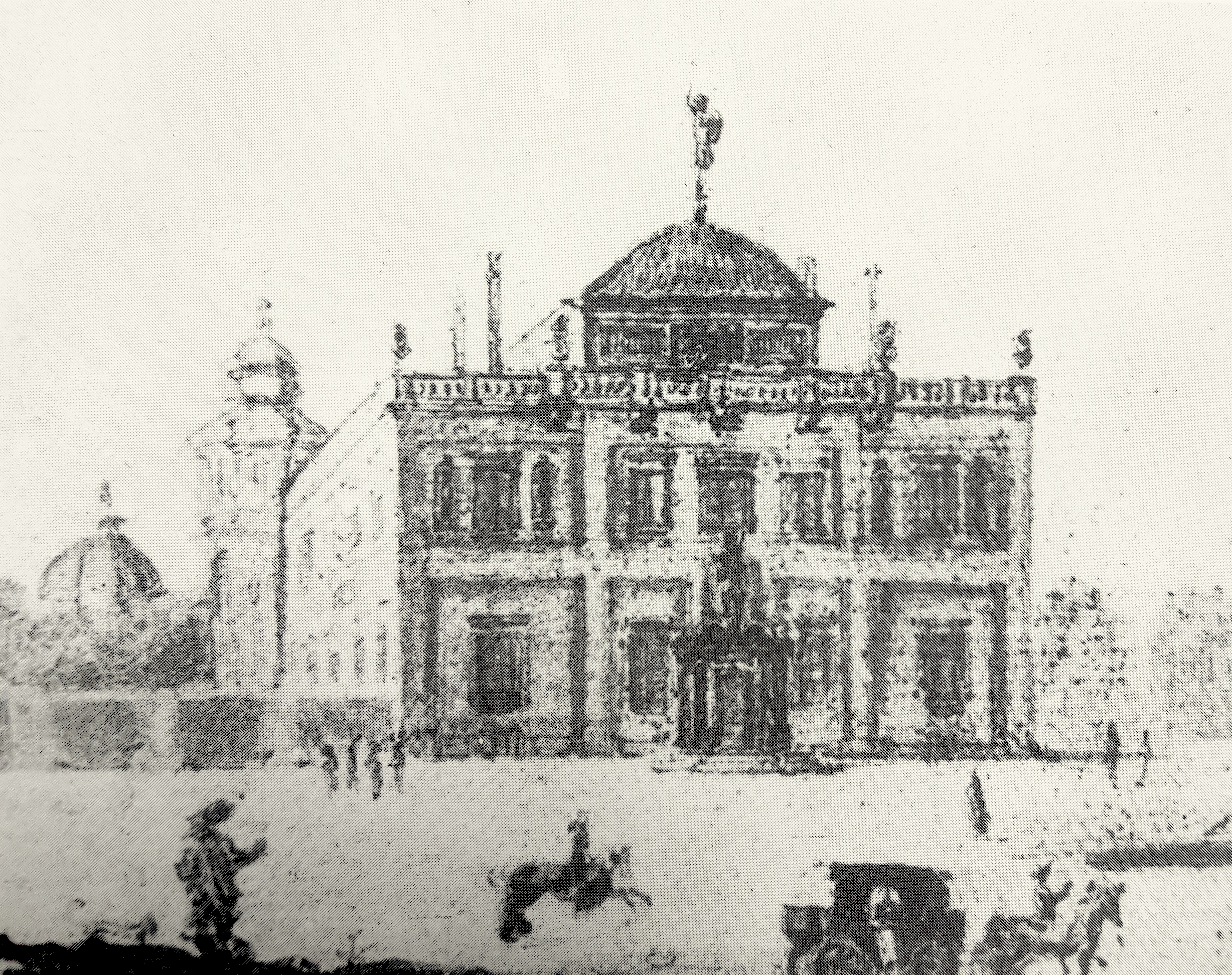
Ossoliński Palace in Warsaw, a drawing by Matthias Palbitzki from about 1656.

Beginning in 1649 sent him Queen Christina diplomatic mission in the Republic of Venice, where he was to negotiate for mediation in the conflict with Poland and the Grand Duchy of Tuscany. In 1650 he posted in Neurenberg, where he brought Charles X Gustav the news of his appointment to the Swedish throne. In 1651, he undertook further diplomatic missions to Madrid. In Spain he reached the resumption of trade relations. He then took an extended trip through the country and visited the city of Saguntum. On his way home he tried in vain to mediate in the Fronde. In 1654 he was sent to the court of Archduke Leopold Wilhelm of Austria in Brussels. He courted the abdicated Queen Christina, who had arrived in Antwerp.

On his duties under Charles X Gustav little is known. By his own account, he followed the Swedish king in the Polish-Swedish War and accompanied him to Hamburg in 1657 and 1658 to Gothenburg.

Under the regency for Charles XI he was resumed in the diplomatic service. From summer 1664 to spring 1665, he was a Swedish ambassador in Warsaw. The following year, he was President of the Government in Swedish Pomerania, at the same time President of the court in Greifswald, and after a few weeks in office, sent again to Poland. In 1666 he was sent to the German imperial court to inform the Swedish position in conflict with Bremen.

Palbitzki had a comprehensive education, including knowledge of Latin and Greek literature. He emerged as a connoisseur and promoter of European, particularly classical and Italian art and promoted foreign artists such as the sculptor Nicolas Cordier.

== Literature ==
- Helmut Backhaus: Mathias Palbitzki. In: Göran Nilzen (ed.): Svenskt biografiskt lexikon. Volume 28: Odeberg - Pederby. Bonnier, Stockholm (1992-) 1994, p 558 f.
- August Ludwig Schlözer (ed.) . Swedish Biography containing a collection of biographies of famous war and statesmen Part 2. David Iversen, Leipzig 1768 S. 571–590.
- Gabriel Anrep (ed.): Svenska adelns Ättar-Taflor. Volume 3: . of Nackreij - Skytte PA Norstedt & Söner, Stockholm, 1862, p 133 f., (in Swedish).
- Lexicon entry in Svenskt biografiskt handlexikon of 1906 (Swedish) Palbitzki, Mattias. In: Nordisk familjebok. Volume 20, Second Edition. Stockholm 1904–1926, p 1269 f. (Swedish)
