= Mariana of the Purification =

Venerable Mariana of the Purification O.Carm

Mystic
- Born: November 5, 1623; Lisbon, Portugal
- Died: December 8, 1695 (aged 72); Beja, Portugal
- Venerated in: Roman Catholic Church
- Major shrine: Church of Salvador (Beja)

Mother Mariana of the Purification (November 5, 1623 in Lisbon – December 8, 1695 in Beja) was a nun of the Carmelite Order of the Ancient Observance who, having been born in Lisbon, Portugal, and lived and professed her religious vows at the Carmelite Convent of Our Lady of Hope in Beja, Portugal, died with the odor of sanctity.

During her life, she reported several apparitions of the Child Jesus and left many autobiographical writings with ascetic interest.

In the 19th century, Bishop Dom António Xavier de Sousa Monteiro made the exhumation of Mother Mariana's, previously analyzed and confirmed as incorrupt by an inspection of Fray Manuel of the Cenacle, and relocated it to the Church of Salvador, in Beja, which is still in the side chapel of the main altar. In the 20th century, with the request of the parish priest and with the permission of Bishop Manuel dos Santos Rocha, the body was again exposed to public veneration. Currently it is covered. The only picture of it is in the Museum Church of Our Lady of Prazeres of Beja.

== See also ==
- Carmelites
