= Richard Frethorne =

Indentured servant

Richard Frethorne was an indentured servant at Martin's Hundred, Virginia in 1622-1623. He is known as the author of letters detailing his miserable condition in Virginia.

== Life ==
Frethorne was from the parish of St. Dunstan-in-the-East in London, where his family received poor relief. In 1622 he was indentured by the parish and sent to Virginia as a servant, arriving in December on the ship Abigail. Textual analysis of his letters suggests he may have been around twelve years old at the time. Frethorne became one of the indentured servants of William Harwood, the “governor” or leader of Martin’s Hundred. In March and April following his arrival, he wrote several letters to his family and associates back in England, listing the miseries of his life in Virginia and begging them to pay off his indenture or, failing that, to send some food which he could then sell. Richard Frethorne died sometime before February 16, 1624 (1623 Old Style), when his name (in this case spelled “Frethram”) appears on a list of the dead at Martin’s Hundred.

== Letters ==
On March 5, 1623 (1622 Old Style) Frethorne wrote to Mr. Bateman, one of the vestrymen of his home parish, asking for his help. He lists various hardships suffered in Virginia, including lack of sufficient food, lack of adequate clothing, and settlements ravaged by recent native attack. He asks Bateman to free him (by paying off the indenture) or to send food, and refers to the biblical story of Joseph and to the books of Jeremiah and Ecclesiasticus.

At the end of March and beginning of April Frethorne wrote to his parents in three installments dated March 20, April 2, and April 3. In these missives he goes into greater and more emotional detail about his lack of food and clothing and about illness in the colony and the threat of native attack. He describes others in his situation as expressing the opinion that being limbless beggars in England would be preferable to their current circumstances.

Frethorne's letter has been cited as evidence that the reports in England that Virginia was being run as a model of justice and equity were incorrect.
