= Carl Friedrich Kielmeyer =

German biologist and naturalist (1765–1844)

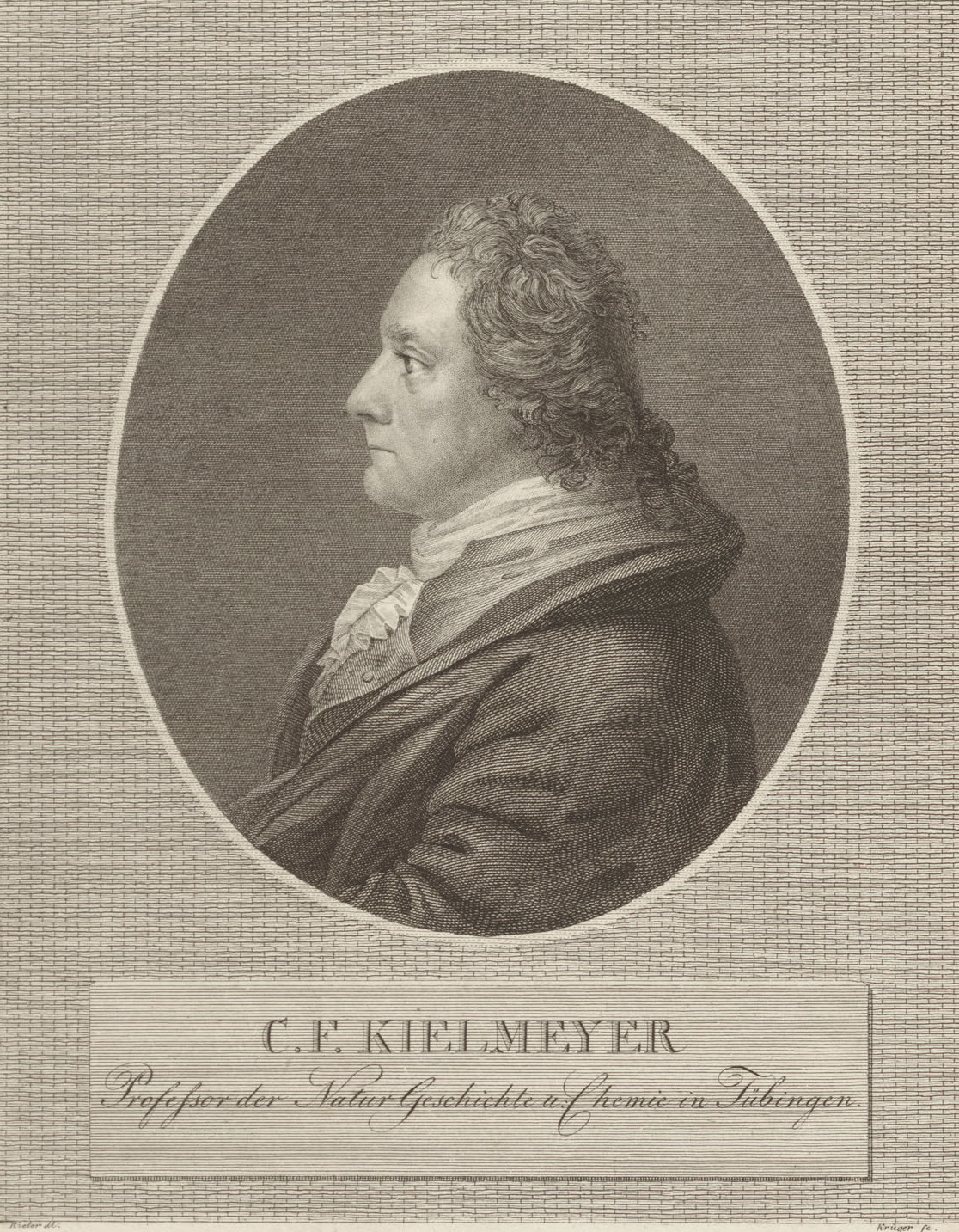
- Born: 22 October 1765; Bebenhausen, Duchy of Württemberg, Holy Roman Empire
- Died: 14 August 1844 (aged 78); Stuttgart, Kingdom of Württemberg
- Education: University of Göttingen
- Known for: Recapitulation theory
- Scientific career
- Fields: Biology
- Workplaces: University of Tübingen
- Academic advisors: Georg Christoph Lichtenberg
- Notable students: Georges Cuvier; Carl August von Eschenmayer
- Author abbrev. (botany): Kielm.

Carl Friedrich Kielmeyer (German: [ˈkiːlˌmaɪ̯ɐ]; 22 October 1765 – 14 August 1844) was a German biologist and naturalist, born in Bebenhausen. He was a pioneer of Naturphilosophie, helped to establish organic chemistry (Pflanzenchemie) as a field, and developed an early version of recapitulation theory through the observation of animal embryos.

== Career ==
He initially studied at Karlsschule Stuttgart, then furthered his education at the University of Göttingen (1786–88), where he had as instructors Johann Friedrich Blumenbach, Johann Friedrich Gmelin and Georg Christoph Lichtenberg. Afterwards, he returned to Karlsschule Stuttgart, where in 1792 he was appointed professor of chemistry.

In 1796 he became a professor of chemistry and botany at the University of Tübingen, where he established the Botanischer Garten der Universität Tübingen in 1804. In 1816 he returned to Stuttgart as scientific director of the royal library, botanical garden, et al. He died in Stuttgart.

Kielmeyer was a pioneer of Naturphilosophie and was an important influence on the career of philosopher Friedrich Schelling. He was a prominent figure in pre-Darwinian evolutionary science, being remembered for development of an early theory of biological recapitulation--the idea that embryos pass through developmental stages that reflect their "primitive ancestors". He published little in his lifetime, and much of what is known about his scientific philosophy is derived from lectures he gave.

== Legacy ==
The plant genus Kielmeyera was named in his honor by Carl Friedrich Philipp von Martius in 1826.

== Publications ==
- 1793 'Ueber die Verhaltnisse der organischen Krafte,' On the Relationships of Organic forces, his major work.
- c.1938 'Gesammelte Schriften,' collected minor writings.

== Footnotes ==
- "This article is based on a translation of an equivalent article at the German Wikipedia".
