= Membrane osmometer =

Device for measuring a polymer's average molecular weight

The operating principle of a membrane osmometer. Water (below) is connected to the solution to be measured (above) via a membrane that lets water through.

In polymer chemistry, a membrane osmometer is a device used to indirectly measure the number average molecular weight (M_{n}) of a polymer sample. One chamber contains pure solvent and the other chamber contains a solution in which the solute is a polymer with an unknown M_{n}. The osmotic pressure of the solvent across the semipermeable membrane is measured by the membrane osmometer. This osmotic pressure measurement is used to calculate M_{n} for the sample.

== Basic operation ==
A low concentration solution is created by adding a small amount of polymer to a solvent. This solution is separated from pure solvent by a semipermeable membrane. Solute cannot cross the semipermeable membrane but the solvent is able to cross the membrane. Solvent flows across the membrane to dilute the solution. The pressure required to stop the flow across the membrane is called the osmotic pressure. The osmotic pressure is measured and used to calculate M_{n}.

In an ideally dilute solution, van ‘t Hoff's law of osmotic pressure can be used to calculate M_{n} from osmotic pressure.

$$\lim_{c \to 0} \left( {\Pi \over c} \right) = {{RT} \over M_n}$$

where:

M_{n} is the number average molecular weight, mass/mole;
R is the gas constant;
T is the absolute temperature, typically Kelvin;
c is the concentration of polymer, mass/volume;
Π is the osmotic pressure.

== Virial equations ==
In practice, the osmotic pressure produced by an ideally dilute solution would be too small to be accurately measured. For accurate M_{n} measurements, solutions are not ideally dilute and a virial equation is used to account for deviations from ideal behavior and allow the calculation of M_{n}. The virial equation takes a form similar to van ‘t Hoff's law of osmotic pressure, but contains additional constants to account for non-ideal behavior:

$${\Pi \over c} = RT\left( {1 \over M_n } + A_1 c + A_2 c^2 + A_3 c^3 + \cdots \right)$$

where A_{n} are constants and c is still the concentration of polymer 1. This virial equation may be represented in different additional forms:

$$\begin{align}
{\Pi \over c} &= {A \over M_n } + B c + C c^2 + D c^3 + \cdots \\[2pt]
&= M_n \Bigl( \Gamma_1 + \Gamma_2 c + \Gamma_3 c^2 + \Gamma_4 c^3 + \cdots \Bigl)
\end{align}$$

where B and Γ are constants, and

$$RTA_2 = B = {RT \over M_n} \Gamma_2.$$

== Different membrane osmometry devices ==
=== Static membrane osmometry ===
Capillary tubes are attached to both the solvent and the solution compartments. In this case the osmotic pressure is provided by the additional pressure of the fluid in the solution compartment. The difference in the height of the fluid in the capillary tube of solution compartment versus the height of the fluid in the capillary tube of the solvent compartment is measured once the solution reaches equilibrium to calculate the osmotic pressure.

$$\Pi = \Delta H \rho g$$

where:

Π is the osmotic pressure;
ΔH is the change in height;
ρ is the density;
g is the acceleration due to gravity.

The main disadvantage of static osmometry is the long time it takes for equilibrium to be reached. It often takes 3 or more hours after the solute is added for the static osmometer to reach equilibrium.

=== Dynamic membrane osmometry ===
In a dynamic osmometer flow of solvent is measured and a counteracting pressure is created to stop the flow. Flow rate of the solvent is measured by the movement of an air bubble in a capillary tube of the solvent. The pressure of the solvent compartment is directly changed by raising or lowering a reservoir of solvent connected to the solvent compartment. The pressure difference between the two compartments is the osmotic pressure. This can be calculate by measuring the change in height or measured directly with a flexible diaphragm. Since the pressure is directly changed, an accurate measurement of osmotic pressure can be achieved in 10 – 30 minutes.

== Limitations of membrane osmometry ==
Membrane osmometry measurements are best used for 30,000 < M_{n} < 1,000,000 grams/mole. For M_{n} above 1,000,000 grams/mole, the solute is too dilute to create a measurable osmotic pressure. For M_{n} below 30,000 grams per mole, the solute permeates through the membrane and the measurements are inaccurate.

Another issue for membrane osmometer is the limited membrane types. The most common membrane used is cellulose acetate; however, cellulose acetate can only be used with toluene and water. While toluene and water are useful solvent for many compounds, not all polymers are miscible in toluene or water. Regenerated cellulose membranes can be used for many other solvents, but are hard to obtain.
