= Georg Balthasar Metzger =

German physician and scientist (1623–1687)

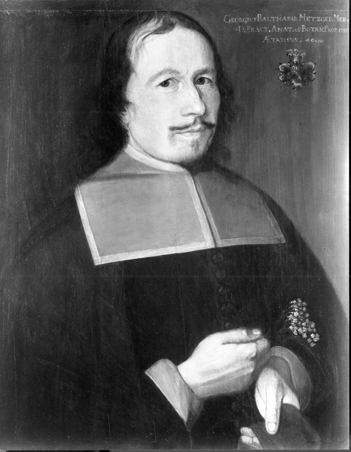
- Georg Balthasar Metzger (1623–1687)
- Born: 23 September 1623; Schweinfurt, Holy Roman Empire
- Died: 9 October 1687 (aged 64); Tübingen, Holy Roman Empire
- Education: University of Jena; University of Basel
- Scientific career
- Fields: Medicine
- Workplaces: University of Tübingen
- Doctoral advisor: Johann Jakob von Brunn
- Other academic advisors: Gottfried Möbius; Emmanuel Stupanus
- Doctoral students: Rudolf Jakob Camerarius; Elias Rudolph Camerarius Sr.

Georg Balthasar Metzger (23 September 1623 – 9 October 1687) was a German physician and scientist notable as one of the four founding members of the Academy of Sciences Leopoldina in Schweinfurt.

== Biography ==
He was born in Schweinfurt.

In 1646 Metzger obtained the Magister Artium degree from the University of Jena under Gottfried Möbius with a thesis entitled: Suppressionem mensium. In 1650, he obtained his medical doctorate from the University of Basel under Johann Jakob von Brunn with a thesis entitled: Disputatio medica inauguralis de catarrho suffocativo.

In 1661 Metzger was appointed to the University of Tübingen by Eberhard III, Duke of Württemberg (1614–74) to improve its teaching of anatomy and surgery. From 1681 to 1688 he also directed the university's Hortus medicus, which has subsequently evolved into the Botanischer Garten der Universität Tübingen. In 1688 its direction passed to Metzer's student, Rudolf Jacob Camerer.

Metzger was Lutheran. He married Margarete Küffner. He died in Tübingen in 1687.

== Selected works ==
- Dissertatio medica inauguralis de acidulis (1663)
- Disputatio medica inauguralis de syncope (1665)
- Urocriterium brevibus thesibus exhibitum (1677)
- Dissertationem medicam inauguralem de medicamentis sternutatoriis (1678)
- Disputatio inauguralis medica de diabete (1679)
- Anatomen dentium human (1685)
