= Karl Wilhelm Heinrich von Kleist =

Prussian military general

Karl Wilhelm Heinrich von Kleist (1 November 1836, Brandenburg - 2 January 1917, Berlin) was a Prussian officer of the Imperial German Army, most recently General of the Cavalry (Germany). On the occasion of his 50th anniversary of service in 1906, Kleist was promoted to General of Cavalry.

== Life ==
=== Hereditary Lineage ===
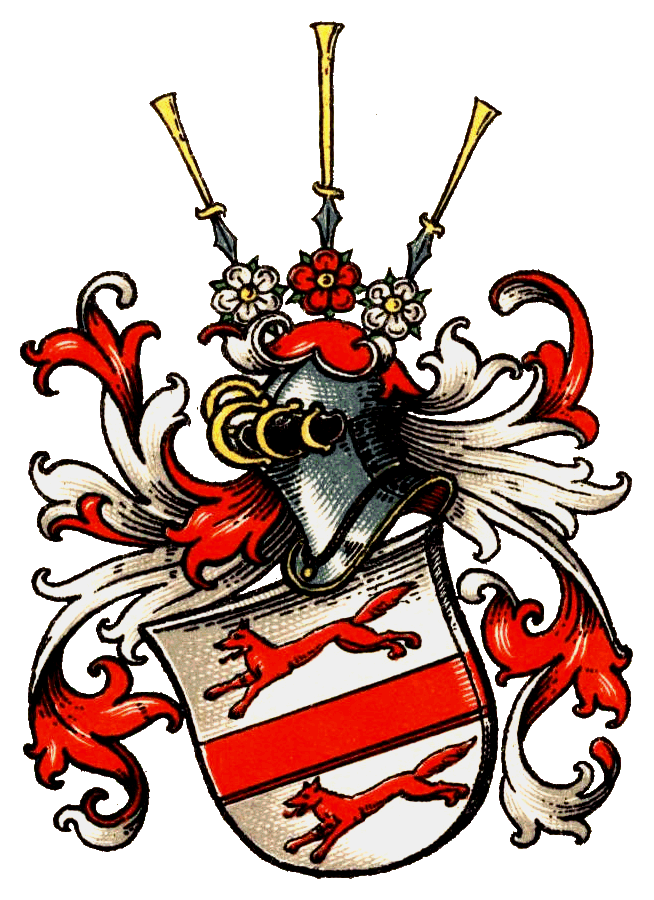
Coat of arms of the Kleist family

Karl Wilhelm Heinrich von Kleist came from the Eastern Pomerania nobility, widely branched into Prussia and the Baltic States Geschlecht Von Kleist. Within the family he belonged to the branch Kleist of Bornstedt Crown Estate to which the Prussian crown was approved on 11 April 1803, the name and coat of arms with the Association of Bornstedt. [1] He was the third son of the Prussian Major Ludwig Karl Kleist of Bornstedt ( 1772-1854), inheriting commissioner on Hohennauen, and his second wife Wilhelmine von Hanstein (1818-1869) [2]

=== Military career ===
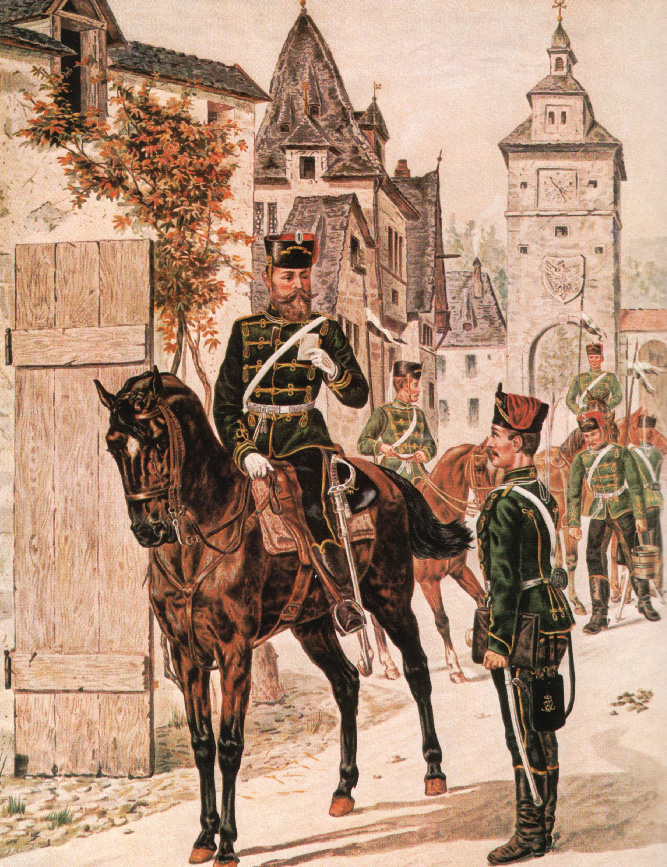
Prussian Hussar 10th Regiment

Because he would not inherit his father's entailed estate, Kleist chose the military profession. He resigned on 6 March 1856 as an ensign in the 10th Hussars Regiment of the Prussian army, where he was appointed on 5 February 1857 Second Lieutenant. Kleist spent a very long time as a lieutenant with multiple dislocations to other units. On 15 December 1863 he was made the adjutant of the 8th Cavalry Brigade, 1866 adjutant of the 7th Division (German Empire) and there promoted on 20 July 1866 to first lieutenant. Again adjutant, this time in the 11th Cavalry Brigade, he was finally supernumerary leaving in his post as a captain. On 14 December 1868 he came back to his unit and was squadron leader. Finally, on 24 October 1871 he was General Staff officer in the 13th Division, after he had previously been seconded for several months to the Great General Staff. From 10 September 1872 he was a Major. After further uses in various positions on the General Staff, he returned in 1878 back to the military service and became final after a period of temporary assignment Commander of the Dragoon Regiment No. 19 and lieutenant colonel. In 1883 he was promoted to colonel and appointed commander of the 25th (Grand Ducal Hessian) Cavalry Brigade and 1888 Major General. Finally, the emperor appointed him on 18 October 1891 the commander of the 10th Division in Poznań and to Lieutenant General. In 1898 he was called into question.

On the occasion of its 50th anniversary service in 1906 Kleist was promoted to General of the cavalry. [3]

=== Family ===
Kleist was married on 19 June 1869 to Clare Gordon (born 6 July 1849 in Breslau; died 1920), daughter of the Prussian General of the Infantry Helmuth von Gordon [4].

=== Awards ===
- Red Eagle Order 3rd Class with Swords on Ring
- Order of the Crown (Prussia) 2nd Class
- Iron Cross 2nd Class (1870)
- Order of the Zähringer Lion Knight's Cross 1st Class with Oak Leaves and Swords
- Oldenburg House and Merit Order of Duke Peter Frederick Louis
