= Alpine garden =

Garden specialized in alpine plants

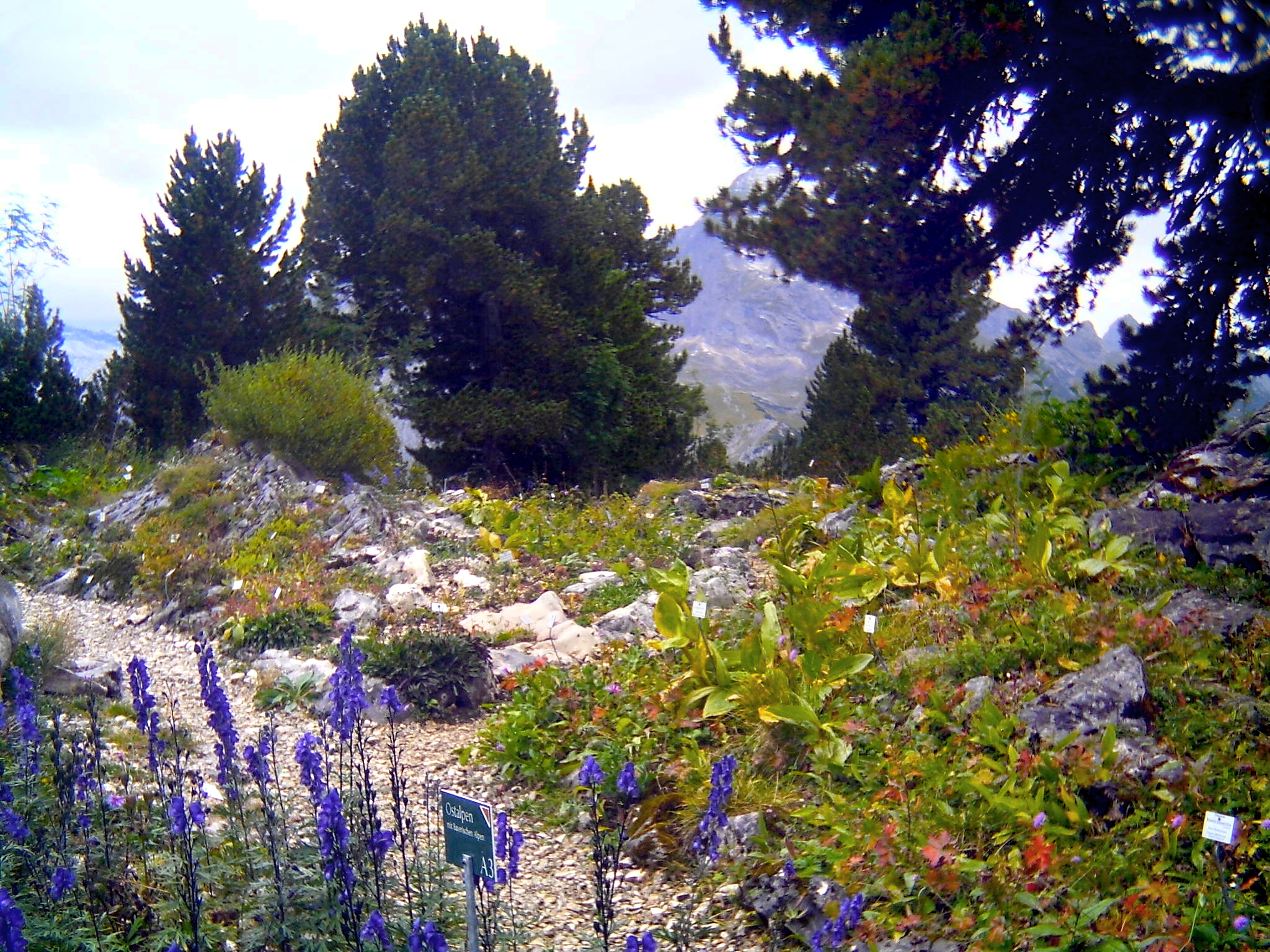
An alpinum adjacent to the King's House on Schachen in Garmisch-Partenkirchen, Germany

An alpine garden (or alpinarium, alpinum) is a domestic or botanical garden, or more often a part of a larger garden, specializing in the collection and cultivation of alpine plants growing naturally at high altitudes around the world, such as in the Caucasus, Pyrenees, Rocky Mountains, Alps, Himalayas and Andes. It is one of the most common types of rock garden.

Although it is often associated with rocks, an alpine garden does not require rocks to thrive. It is the alpine plants that is the focus, not the rocks. Scientifically, alpine plants are characterized as plants that grow above the tree line in mountainous regions, where the environment makes it hard for plants to produce woody tissues. From the horticulture perspective, any plants with a suitable size and is able to withstand harsh conditions such as a rock garden, trough, or raised beds could be considered as alpine. They are often smaller in stature and more hardy.

An alpine garden tries to imitate the conditions of the plants' place of origin. One example of this is using large stones and gravel beds, rather than the soil that naturally grows there. Though the plants can cope with low temperatures, they dislike standing in damp soil during the winter months. The soil used is typically poor (sandy) and extremely well-drained. One of the main obstacles in developing an alpine garden is the unsuitable conditions which exist in some areas, particularly mild or severe winters and heavy rainfall, such as those present in the United Kingdom and Ireland. This can be avoided by growing the plants in an alpine house (essentially an unheated greenhouse), which tries to reproduce the ideal conditions, or just covering them with a raised sheet of glass in winter. According to some Austrian sources, the first true alpine garden was created by Anton Kerner von Marilaun in 1875 on the Blaser Mountain, in Tyrol, Austria, at an altitude of 2,190 m (7,190 ft).

== Vegetation ==
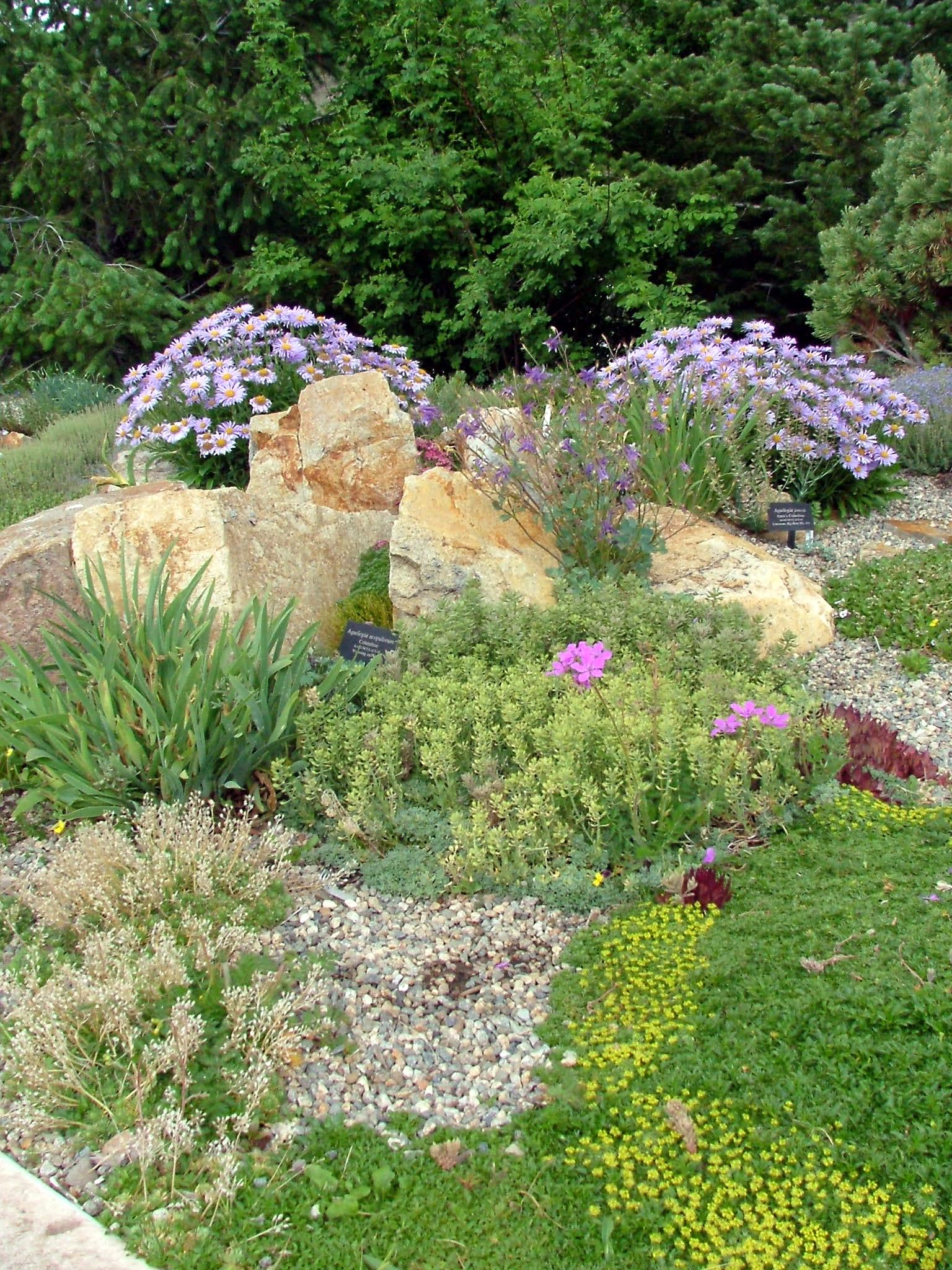
Betty Ford Alpine Gardens

Typical plants found in an alpine garden include:

- Androsace
- Arabis alpina (rock cress)
- Campanula - alpine species
- Dianthus - alpine species
- Gentiana
- Geranium dalmaticum (cranesbill)
- Globularia
- Iberis sempervirens (candytuft)
- Leontopodium
- Phlox subulata
- Pulsatilla vulgaris (pasque flower)
- Primula - alpine species
- Ranunculus (buttercup)
- Rhodanthemum hosmariense
- Saxifraga - alpine species
- Scutellaria orientalis (helmet flower)
- Sedum spathulifolium (stonecrop)
- Sisyrinchium
- Thymus (thyme)

== Botanical gardens with an alpine house or garden ==
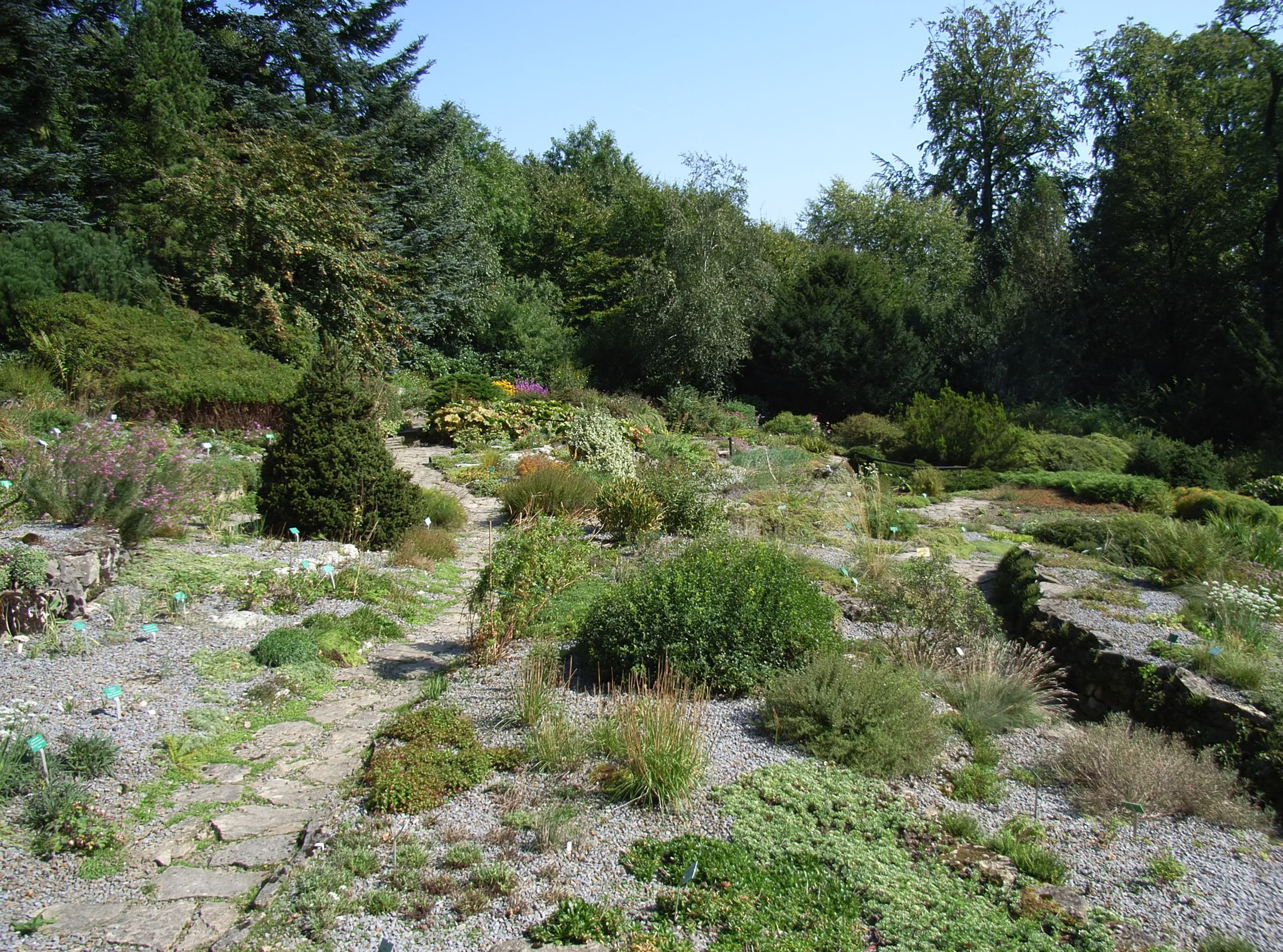
The alpinum in Botanischer Garten Bielefeld, Germany

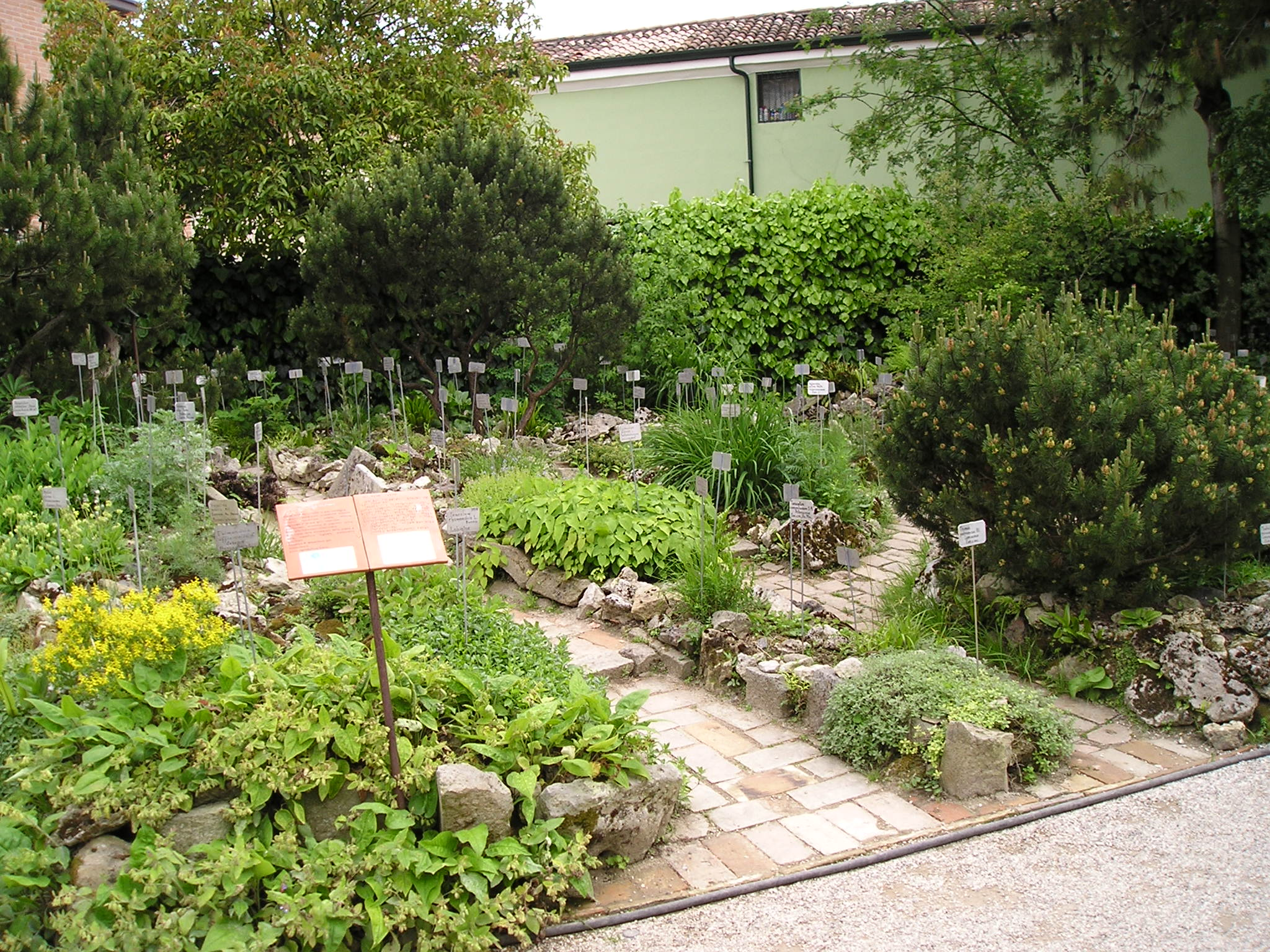
Alpinum in Orto botanico di Padova, Italy

Austria

- Botanical Garden of the University of Innsbruck

Belgium

- Plantentuin Universiteit Gent

Canada
- Jardin botanique de Montréal
- University of Alberta Botanic Garden: Patrick Seymour Alpine Garden
- University of British Columbia: E.H. Lohbrunner Alpine Garden
- Alpinegium

China

- Lijiang Alpine Botanic Garden

France

- Jardin des Plantes
- Jardin botanique alpin du Lautaret
- Jardin botanique alpin La Jaÿsinia

Germany

- Botanischer Erlebnisgarten Altenburg
- Botanical Garden in Berlin
- Botanischer Garten Bielefeld
- Botanischer Garten Düsseldorf
- Botanischer Garten Gießen
- Botanischer Garten der Johann Wolfgang Goethe-Universität Frankfurt am Main
- Botanischer Garten München-Nymphenburg
- Botanischer Garten Münster
- Botanischer Garten Marburg
- Botanischer Garten Potsdam
- Botanischer Garten der Ruhr-Universität Bochum

Italy

- Orto botanico di Padova

Slovenia

- Alpine Botanical Garden Juliana

Switzerland

Jardin alpin La Linnaea

The Netherlands

- Botanische Tuin Fort Hoofddijk
- Hortus Botanicus Amsterdam

United Kingdom

- Royal Botanic Gardens, Kew
- RHS Wisley
- Royal Botanic Garden Edinburgh

United States

- Betty Ford Alpine Gardens
- Denver Botanic Gardens

== See also ==
- List of garden types
