= List of botanical gardens in Austria =

Botanical gardens in Austria have collections consisting entirely of Austria native and endemic species; most have a collection that include plants from around the world. There are botanical gardens and arboreta in all states and territories of Austria, most are administered by local governments, some are privately owned.

- Patscherkofel Alpine Garden – University of Innsbruck
- Innsbruck University Botanic Garden
- Linz Botanic Garden – Linz
- Botanical Garden of the University of Vienna
