= Bornstedt (Potsdam) =

- Stadtteil of Potsdam
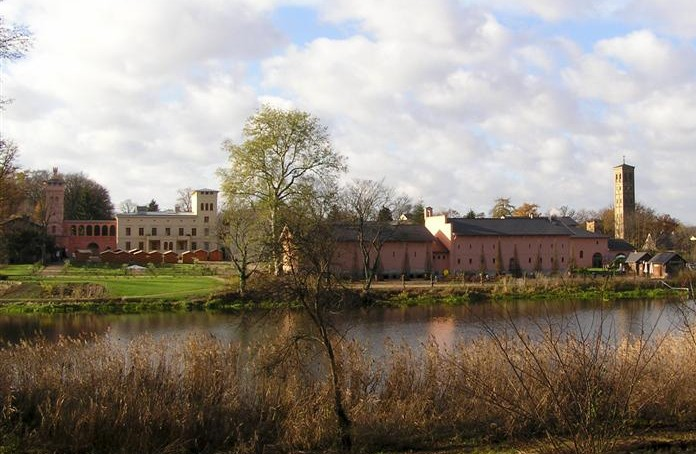
- Crown Estate and Church
- Interactive map of Bornstedt
- Location within Germany Location within Brandenburg
- Coordinates: 52°24′48″N 13°1′46″E
- Country: Germany
- State: Brandenburg
- Town: Potsdam
- Elevation: 38 m (125 ft)

Population (2009-12-31)
  - Total: 7,954
- Time zone: UTC+01:00 (CET)
  - Summer (DST): UTC+02:00 (CEST)
- Postal codes: 14469
- Dialling codes: 0331
- Vehicle registration: P

Bornstedt (German pronunciation: [ˈbɔʁnʃtɛt]) is a borough of Potsdam, Germany. Located north of Sanssouci Park and the Orangery Palace, it is known for the Bornstedt Crown Estate, former residence of Princess Royal Victoria, and the Bornstedt Cemetery with numerous tombs of famous personages.

== History ==
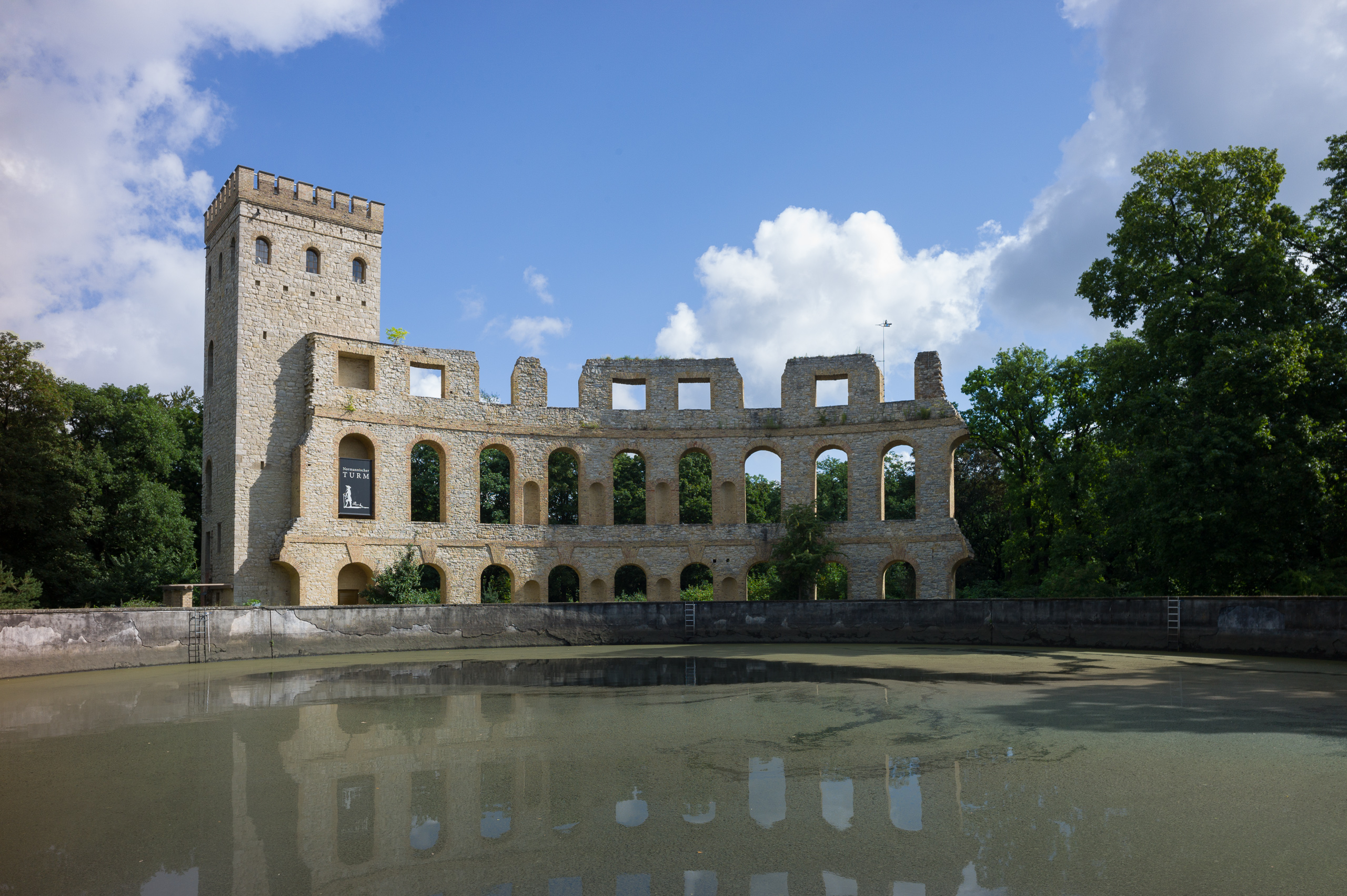
Ruinenberg reservoir

The settlement arose in the late 12th century, it was first mentioned in a 1304 deed. The Bornstedt manor comprised the present-day gardens of Sanssouci, it was acquired by the "Great Elector" Frederick William of Brandenburg in 1664. The Prussian king Frederick William I ceded the estates to the Potsdam orphanage; his son King Frederick the Great had to pay a significant compensation before building Sanssouci Palace from 1744 onwards. He had a water basin erected atop a hill north of the park in order to supply the fountain system, which ultimately failed due to lack of expertise. Frederick had the reservoir decorated with artificial ruins and the hill was called Ruinenberg.

From about 1750 the Bornstedt fields were used as a proving ground of the Prussian Army, much to the chagrin of local cotters, until King Frederick William IV after his accession to the throne in 1840 repurchased the estates. He had the Bornstedt manor reorganised according to the concepts of Peter Joseph Lenné and turned it into a model agricultural business. The court architect Ferdinand von Arnim built a Norman tower atop Ruinenberg hill and had the Bornstedt manor house and church redesigned in an Italian style according to plans by Friedrich Ludwig Persius. The king also had the village church rebuilt by Friedrich August Stüler in 1854.

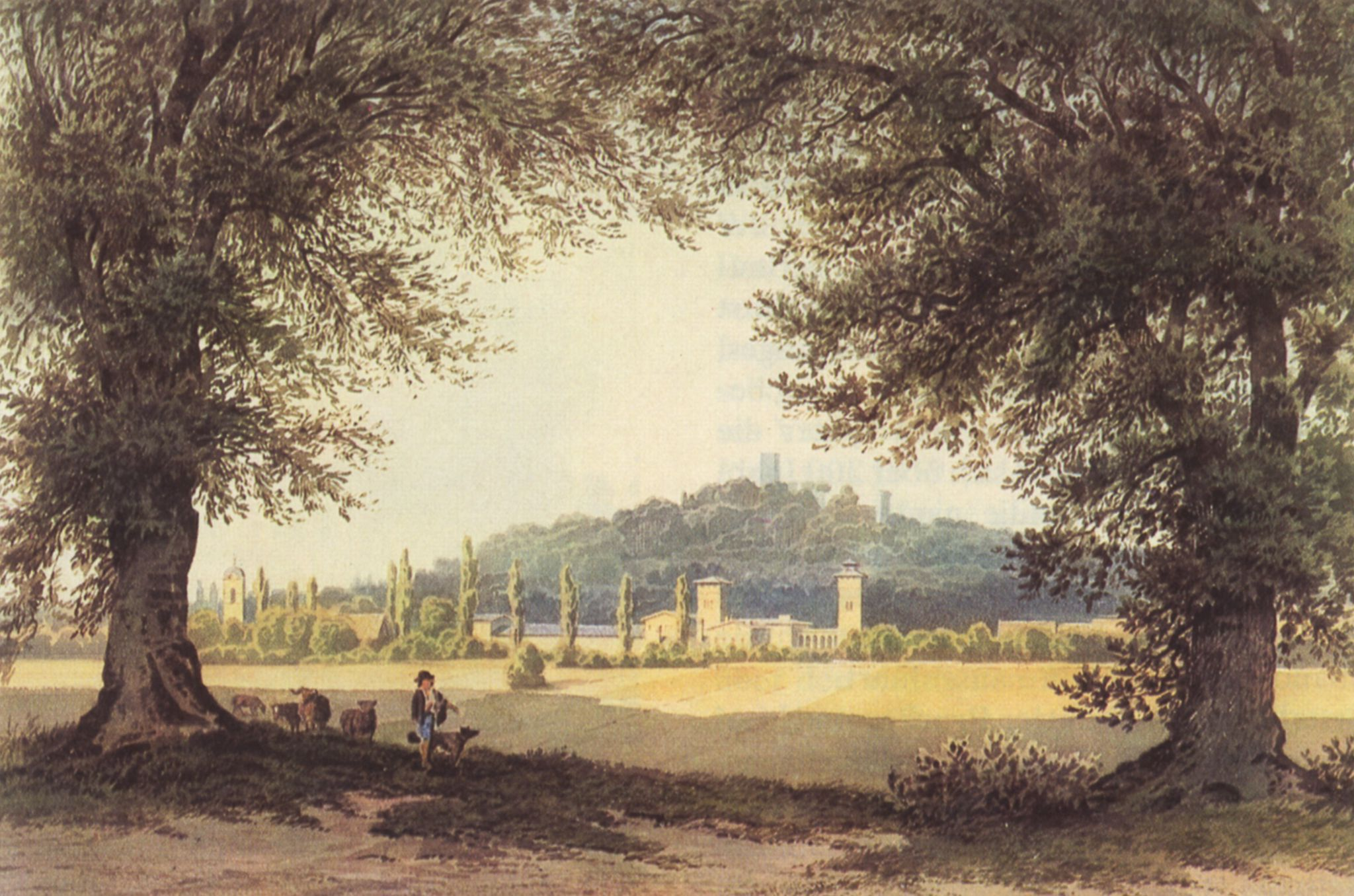
Bornstedt and Ruinenberg, c. 1850

In 1864 King William I of Prussia (German Emperor from 1871) handed the Bornstedt estate over to his son, Crown Prince Frederick and his wife Victoria, the daughter of Queen Victoria. The Princess Royal continued the agricultural business as a model farm, she had the manor rebuilt and her son Wilhelm II attended the Bornstedt village school. Upon the death of Emperor Frederick in 1888, however, Victoria left Bornstedt and retired to Friedrichshof Castle in Kronberg im Taunus.

In 1928 the crown estates of Bornstedt and Sansouci were incorporated into Potsdam, the former Bornstedt municipality followed in 1935 (by personal decree of Hermann Göring). It became the military base of the Wehrmacht Infantry Regiment 9 Potsdam and several barracks were erected in the vicinity. The Bornstedt Cemetery was enlarged with a "heroes' grove", decorated with a sculpture by Walter Lemcke. After World War II, the military facilities were used by the Soviet Army until 1993, today many buildings belong to the Fachhochschule Potsdam college campus.

In 2001, the Bornstedt Fields were the site of the Federal Horticultural Exhibition (Bundesgartenschau). The present-day Volkspark includes the Potsdam Biosphere.

== Landmarks ==
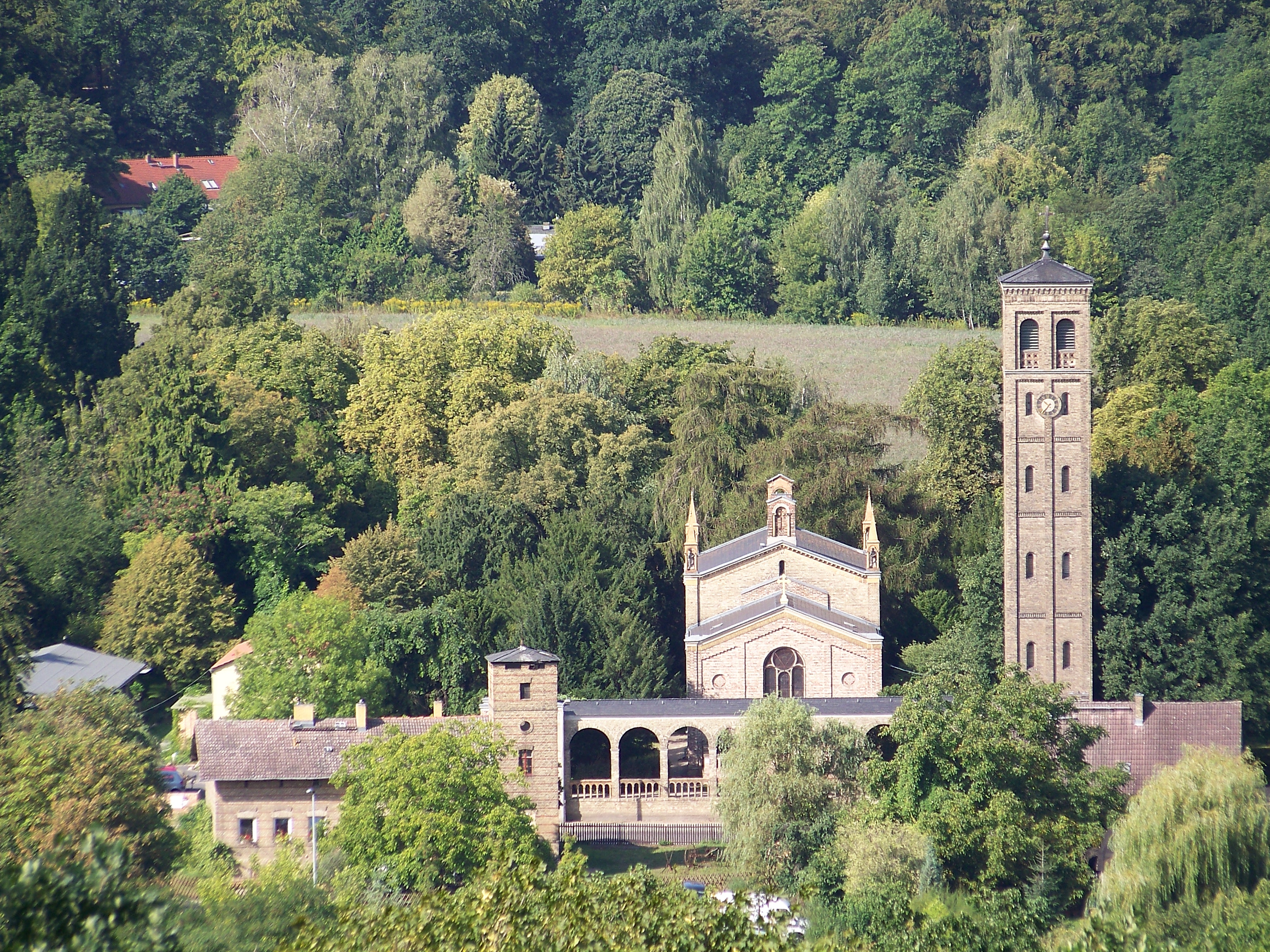
Bornstedt Church

- Volkspark (formerly the Bugapark)
- Bornstedt Fields
- Bornstedt Crown Estate
- Bornstedt Church, rebuilt from 1854 by Friedrich August Stüler in an Italian style with a portico and a 34 m (112 ft) tall campanile, including the tomb of Jacob Paul von Gundling; it was finished in 1881/82.
- Bornstedt Cemetery, in which members of the Sello dynasty of court gardeners, the landscaper Peter Joseph Lenné, the architects Ferdinand von Arnim and Friedrich Ludwig Persius, Frederick the Great's court physician Johann Goercke and private secretary Henri de Catt, as well as figure skater Gillis Grafström, Admiral Ludwig von Reuter, and Prince Wilhelm-Karl of Prussia, the last grandchild of Emperor Wilhelm II, are buried.
