= Emanuel Bardou =

Swiss sculptor

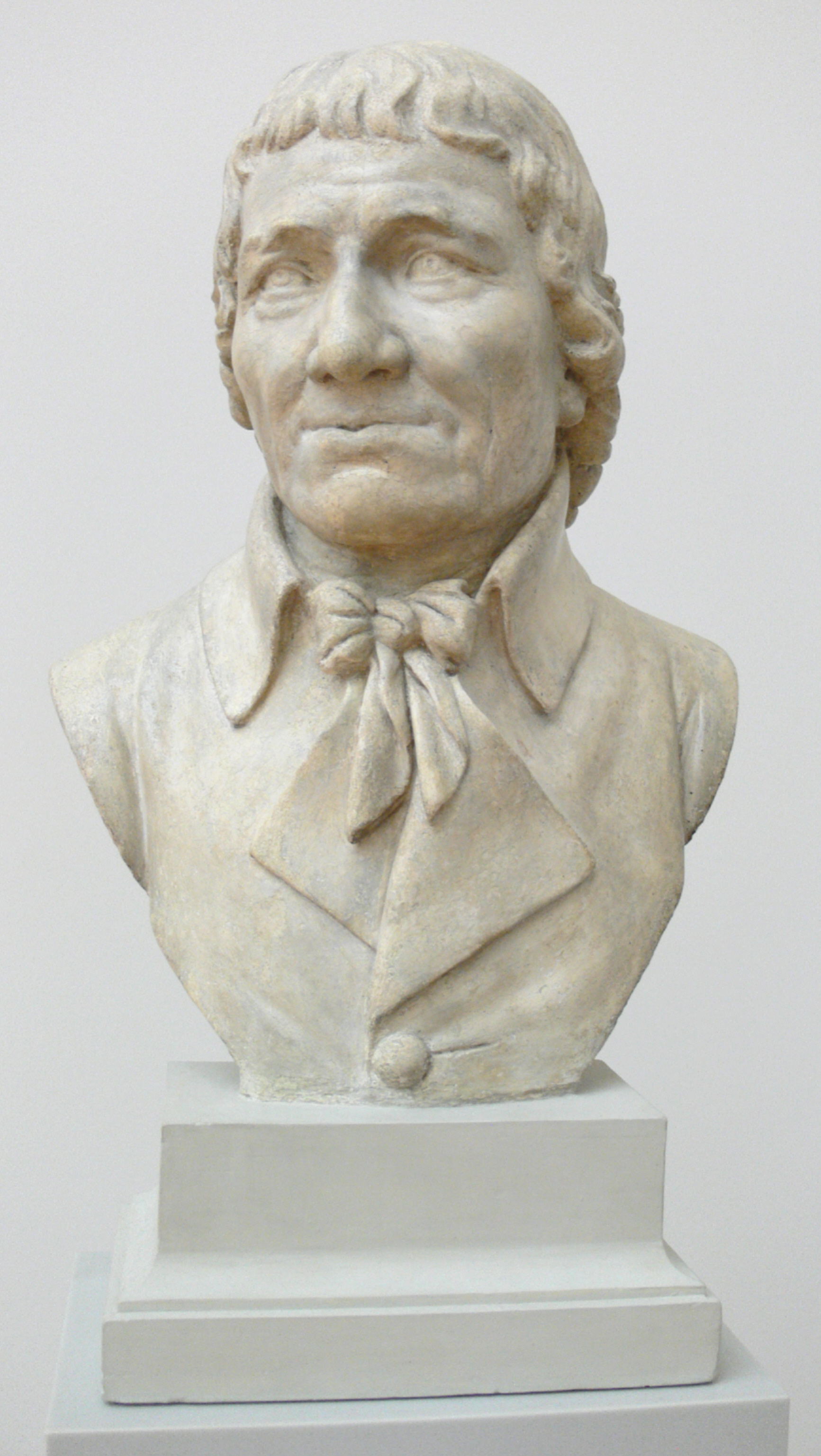
Bust of Chodowiecki (1801)

Emanuel Bardou (4 January 1744, Basel – 7 June 1818, Berlin) was a Swiss sculptor who worked at the Prussian Court in Berlin.

== Life ==
He was a student of Lambert-Sigisbert Adam and, beginning in 1775, worked as a modeller at the Royal Porcelain Factory, Berlin. His first exhibition came in 1786 with statuettes of Frederick the Great and Kurt Christoph Graf von Schwerin, the success of which enabled him to leave the factory. He became a teacher at the Prussian Academy of Arts in 1788.

Following Frederick's death, a competition to create his monument ensued among the sculptors of Berlin. This competition came to be known as the "Kostümstreit" (Costume Dispute) because of disagreements over how Frederick was to be depicted. Johannes Eckstein (who had made the King's death mask) favored showing him dressed as a Roman Emperor. Bardou joined with those who preferred an equestrian statue. Ultimately, public opinion came to Bardou's side, but not until 18 years after his death.

Among his best known works are busts of Immanuel Kant (1798) and Daniel Chodowiecki. He produced two busts of his friend Chodowiecki from death masks; one with a wig and one without. The tomb of D.E. Roloff (a preacher) in St. Mary's Church (1794) is, perhaps, his largest work.

His brother, Paul Joseph, and his son Karl Wilhelm were both portrait painters.
