= Paul Joseph Bardou =

German portrait painter

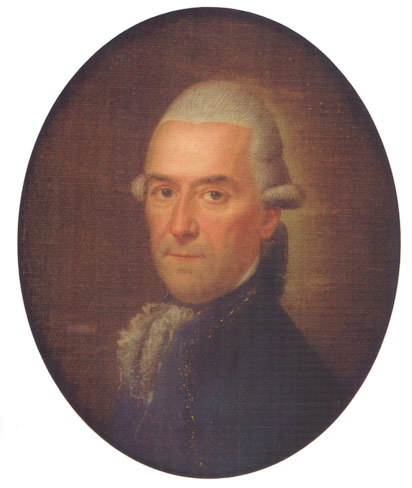
Portrait of Henri de Catt

Paul Joseph Bardou (1745 – 1 February 1814) was a German portrait painter.

== Life and work ==
He was born in Basel to Antoine Bardou (1697–1783), a stocking weaver from Languedoc, and his wife Elisabeth Suzanne Pederotta. In the late 1840s, while he was still a young child, his family moved from Basel to Berlin.

He attended the Französisches Gymnasium Berlin but, since the time he was only eleven, he had been taking drawing lessons at the Academy of Arts with Blaise Nicholas Le Sueur. By 1770, he was taking his own students. In 1804, he was named a member of the Prussian Academy of Arts. By 1806, he was already being confused with the portrait painter, Johann P. Bardou, a Baltic-German artist who worked in Warsaw and St. Petersburg.

Among his best known portraits are those of the poet, Johann Timotheus Hermes, Princess Louise of Prussia, Henri de Catt (private secretary to Frederick the Great), and the composer, Carl Friedrich Zelter. He worked mostly in pastels, but his larger portraits are in oils.

He died at the age of sixty-nine in Berlin. His younger brother, Emanuel Bardou, was a sculptor and his nephew, Karl Wilhelm Bardou, was also a portrait painter.

== Sources ==
- Bardou, Paul Joseph. In: Georg Kaspar Nagler: Neues allgemeines Künstler-Lexicon; oder Nachrichten von dem Leben und den Werken der Maler, Bildhauer, Baumeister, Kupferstecher etc. Band 1: A–Boe. Fleischmann, München 1835, S. 272–273 (babel.hathitrust.org).
- Paul Joseph Bardou in: Neil Jeffares, Dictionary of pastellists before 1800 (pastellists.com PDF; 568 kB).
