= Henri de Catt =

Swiss scholar

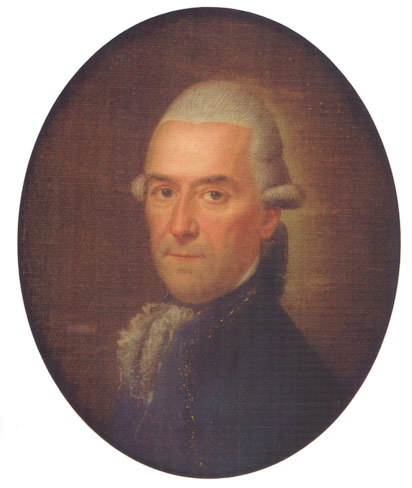
Portrait of Henri de Catt by Paul Joseph Bardou (1780)

Henri Alexandre de Catt (25 June 1725–23 November 1795), a Swiss scholar, was from 1758 the private secretary and close confidant of Frederick the Great of Prussia. He is often described as the king's "reader" (Vorleser), but in fact did not read anything out loud as such, but was engaged principally in correcting Frederick's pronunciation and written expression in French, his preferred language for general purposes. During this time de Catt kept a diary, which since its publication in 1885 has been the source of many episodes of Frederick's life and of things he said.

== Biography ==
De Catt was born in Morges in the canton of Vaud in Switzerland. He studied in Utrecht. In 1755 he corresponded with Laurent Angliviel de la Beaumelle.

In 1755 Frederick made a tour of the Netherlands incognito, in the course of which he had discussions with, among others, the banker Isaac de Pinto. During a visit to Utrecht he met de Catt, who at this time was tutor to a brother of Isabelle de Charrière, on a ship and fell into conversation with him. Frederick was so impressed with de Catt that six weeks later he invited him to enter his service. De Catt began his duties in 1758 and remained until 1780, when he fell into disfavour. In 1760 Frederick nominated him to membership of the Prussian Academy of Sciences. In his last years he was blind. He died in 1795 in Potsdam and was buried in the church of Bornstedt.

== Works ==
- Friedrich der Große Gespräche mit Henri de Catt. Munich: dtv bibliothek, 1981. ISBN 3-423-06115-4

== Bibliography ==
- Hartkopf, W. (1983): Die Akademie der Wissenschaften der DDR. Ein Beitrag zu ihrer Geschichte. Biografischer Index, p. 98. Akademie, Berlin
- Koser, R. (ed.), 1884: Unterhaltungen mit Friedrich dem Großen: Memoiren und Tagebücher von Heinrich de Catt. Reprinted 1965, Osnabrück: Zeller
