= Betty Ford Alpine Gardens =

Botanical gardens in Vail, Colorado, United States

Coordinates: 39.6397°N 106.3658°W

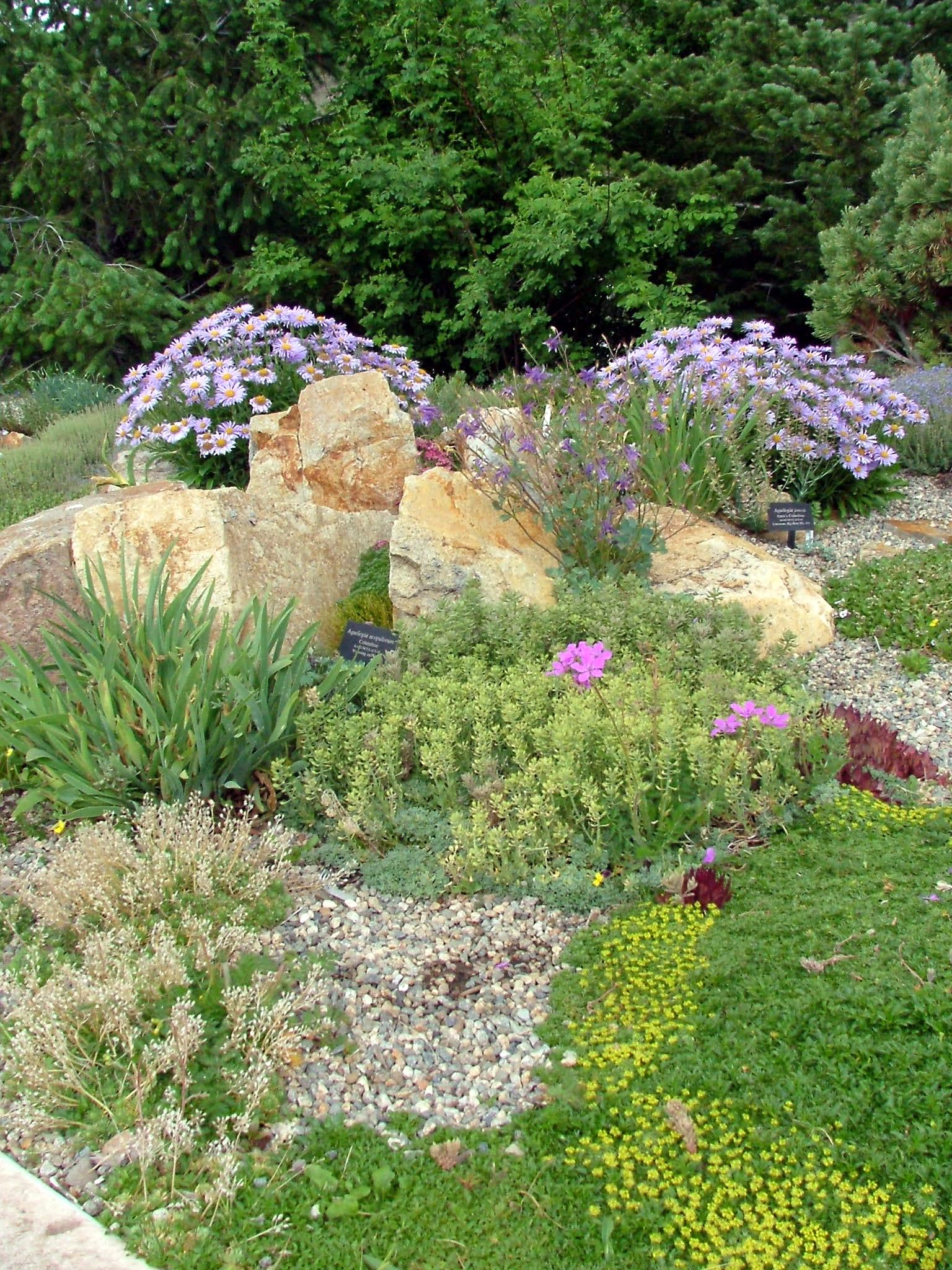
- Interactive map of Betty Ford Alpine Gardens
- Type: Botanical gardan
- Location: Vail, Colorado
- Elevation: 8,200 ft (2,500 m)
- Created: 1985
- Website: bettyfordalpinegardens.org

The Betty Ford Alpine Gardens are one of the world's highest botanical gardens, located at 522 S Frontage Road E, Vail, Colorado, United States, at an 8,200 feet (2,500 m) altitude in the Rocky Mountains. The Gardens mission is "to protect the alpine environment through education, conservation and living plant collections". They offer programming such as rotating exhibits, garden tours, workshops, expert speakers, plant sale, yoga and more.

The Gardens were founded by Vail and Denver horticulturists in 1985, with subsequent planting of the Alpine Display Garden (1987), Mountain Perennial Garden (1989), Mountain Meditation Garden (1991), and the Alpine Rock Garden (1999) with its stunning 120-foot waterfall. Other gardens include the Silk Road Garden and Children's Garden. Together these gardens contain about 2,000 varieties of plants, including over 500 different varieties of wildflowers and alpine plants. The gardens were named in honour of first lady Betty Ford in 1988.

In 2020, along with Denver Botanic Gardens, the Gardens published the North American Botanic Garden Strategy for Alpine Plant Conservation and began implementing its principles.

The gardens are open to the public year-round; admission is free with suggested donation.

== See also ==
- List of botanical gardens in the United States
