= Botanischer Garten Bielefeld =

Botanical garden in Bielefeld, North Rhine-Westphalia, Germany

Coordinates: 52°00′53″N 08°30′36″E

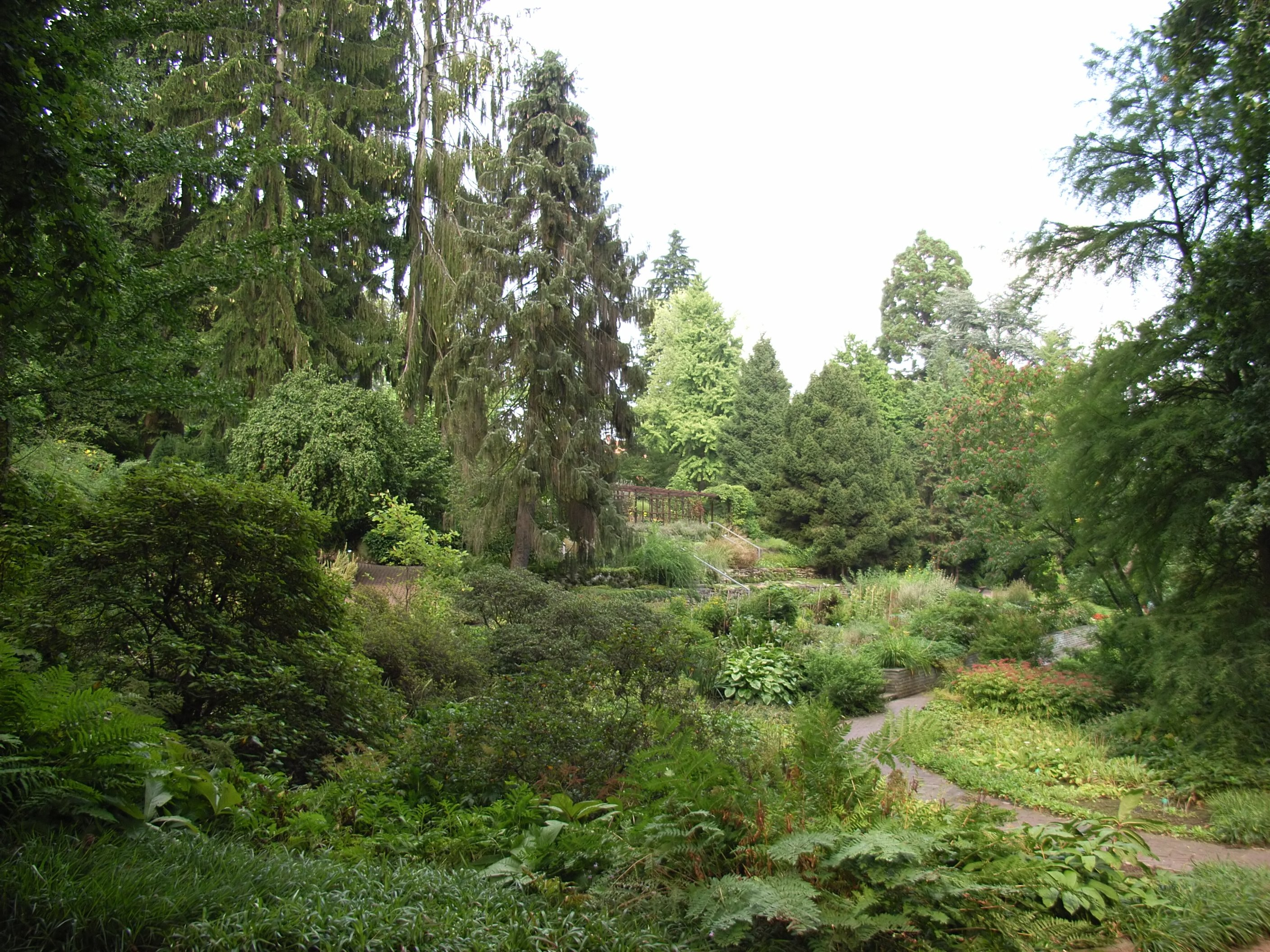
Botanischer Garten Bielefeld

The Botanischer Garten Bielefeld (4 hectares) is a municipal botanical garden located beside the southeast edge of the Teutoburger Wald at Am Kahlenberg 16, Bielefeld, North Rhine-Westphalia, Germany. It is open daily and free of charge.

The garden was established in 1912 on one hectare. It was enlarged between 1914 and 1915 with the installation of the alpine garden, which contains about 500 different plant species. From 1925 to 1927, it was further expanded by an additional 2.5 hectares to the west for its rhododendron collection. By 1952, it contained about 3000 species.

Today, the garden features about 2500 plant varieties. Its highlights include a rhododendron and azalea collection, alpine garden, medicinal and herb garden, heather garden, flora of the Buchenwald region, and a half-timbered house dating from 1823.

== See also ==
- List of botanical gardens in Germany
