= Botanical Garden of Ruhr University Bochum =

Botanical garden in North Rhine-Westphalia, Germany

Coordinates: 51°26′31″N 7°16′3″E

Botanischer Garten der Ruhr-Universität Bochum
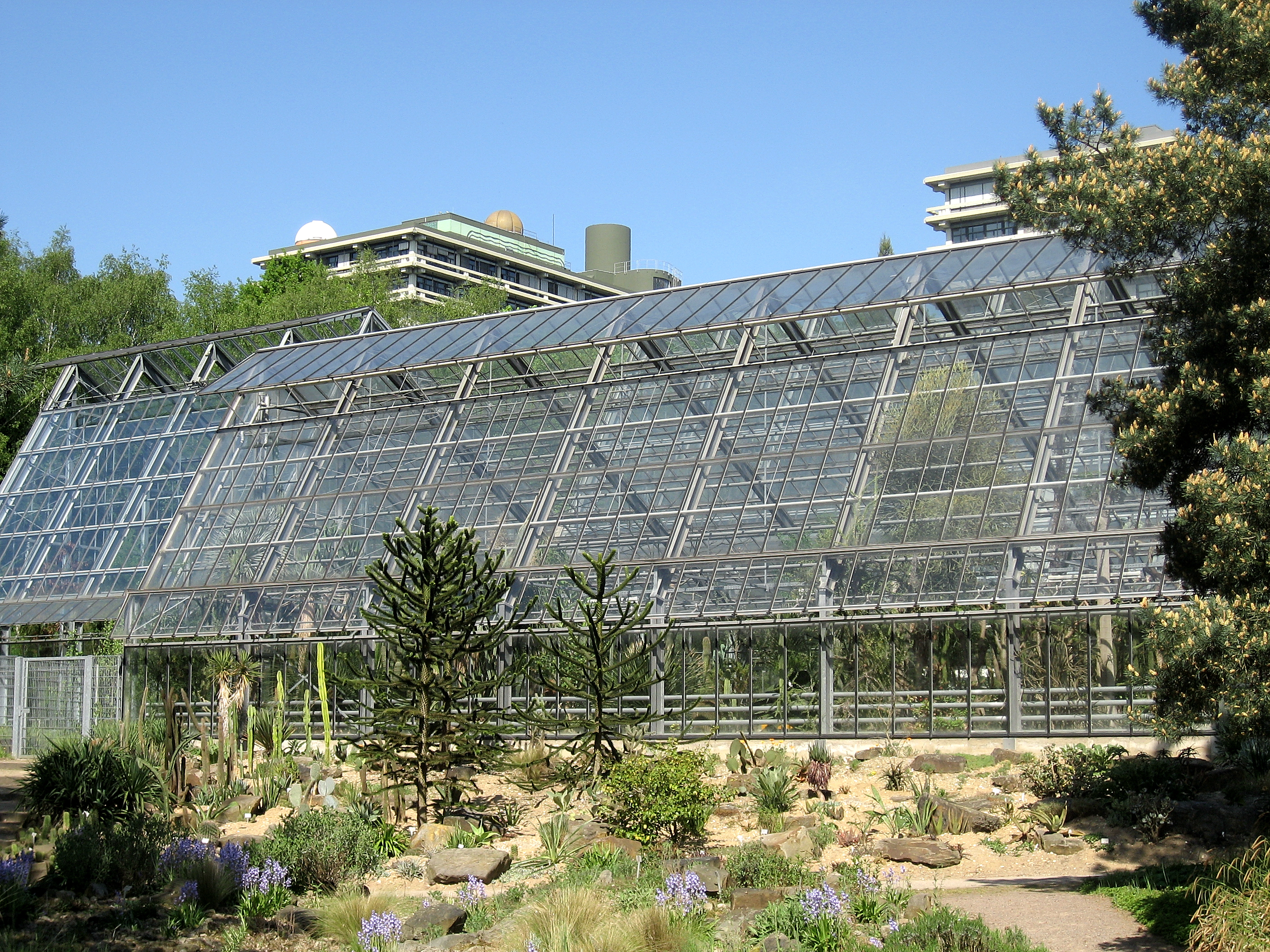
- Botanischer Garten der Ruhr-Universität Bochum
- Interactive map of Botanischer Garten der Ruhr-Universität Bochum
- Type: Botanical garden
- Location: Universitätsstraße 150
- Nearest city: Bochum
- Area: 13 hectares (32 acres)
- Created: 1968
- Operator: Ruhr University Bochum
- Open: Daily

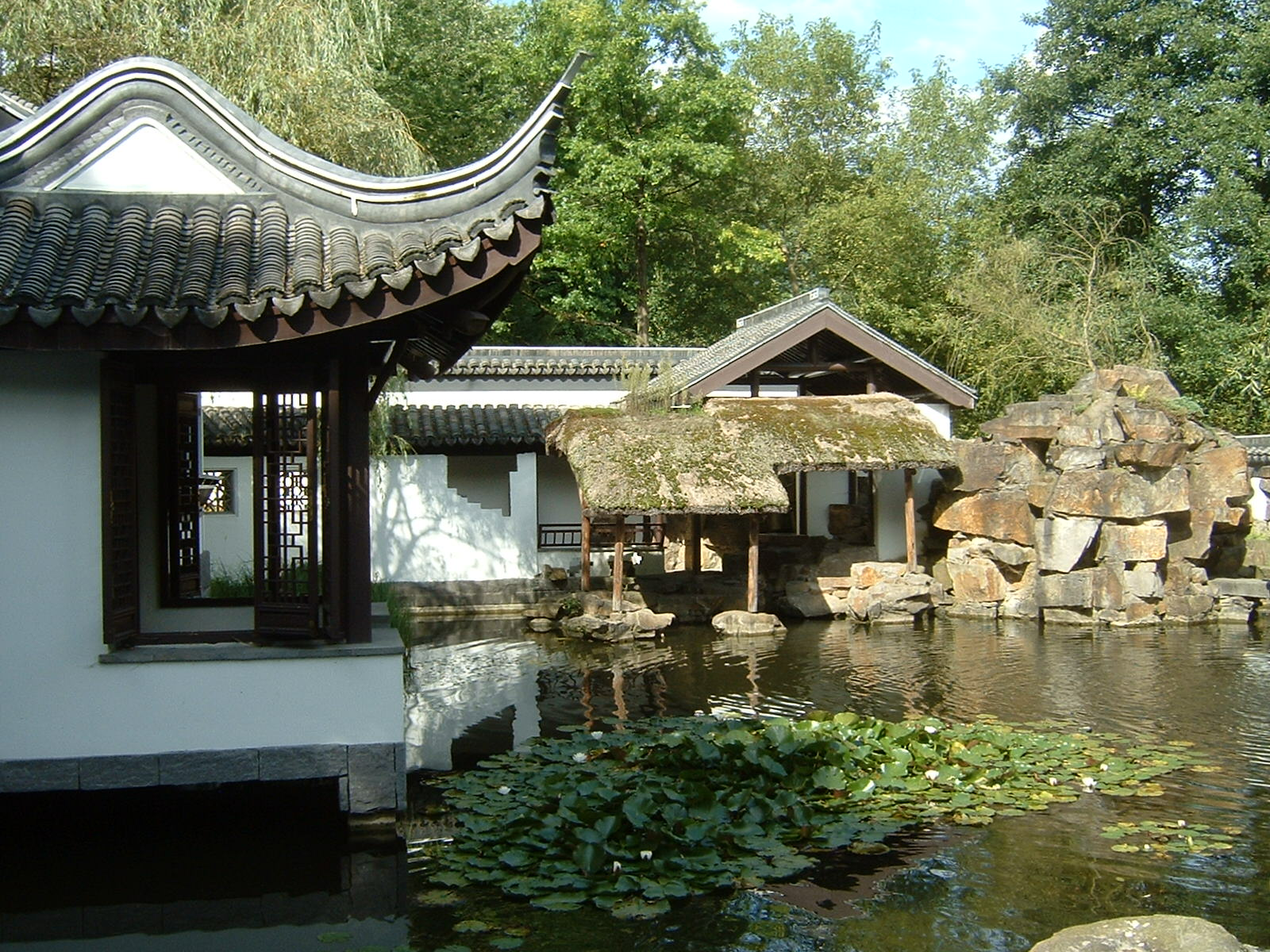
Chinese garden

The Botanischer Garten der Ruhr-Universität Bochum (13 hectares), also known as the Botanischer Garten Bochum, is a botanical garden maintained by the Ruhr University Bochum. It is located at Universitätsstraße 150, Bochum, North Rhine-Westphalia, Germany, and open daily without charge.

The garden was founded in 1968 and subsequently has been continuously expanded and improved. It opened to the public in 1971, with later developments as follows: tropical house, 1976; desert house, 1988; Chinese garden, 1990; savannah houses, 2000.

The garden's fenced, outdoors area (13,000 m^{2}) cultivates plants organized into geobotanical regions, including forests, coasts, meadows, prairies, and marshes from the Americas, Asia, and Europe. It also contains an alpine garden and succulent garden.

Its Chinese garden (1000 m^{2}) was created from 1986 to 1990, and renovated in 2001, by skilled gardeners donated by the Tongji University in Shanghai as a sign of friendship. It is named Qian Yuan (Qian Garden), reflecting a memory of poet Tao Qian (365-427 AD), and laid out in the southern Chinese style. A pond covers half its area.

The garden's greenhouses (total area 3,500 m^{2}) contain collections of succulent Euphorbia (350 species), other succulents, Cycadaceae, Canary Island plants, Eriocaulaceae (5 species), and alpine plants. They are organized as follows:

- Tropical house (713 m^{2}, 17 meter height) - tropical jungle vegetation and useful plants, with a small stream, herbs, banana trees, coffee bushes, etc.
- Desert house - dry tropical and subtropical plants from South America, Madagascar, and South Africa.
- Savannah houses - sclerophyllous shrubs from the savannahs of South Africa and Australia with accompanying vegetation. Collections include many eucalyptus species, as well as Australian grass trees (Xanthorrhoea) and an arborescent Cussonia.
- Alpine House (140 m^{2}) - plants from high mountains

== See also ==
- List of botanical gardens in Germany
