= Julius von Mirbach =

German politician

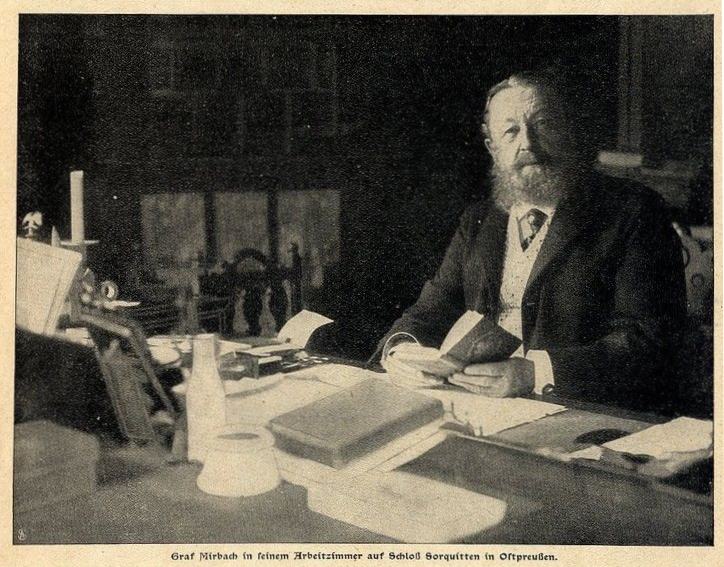
Count Julius von Mirbach-Sorquitten in his study in 1905

Julius Graf von Mirbach (27 June 1839 in Sorquitten – 26 June 1921) was a German politician, born in Sorquitten, East Prussia.

He studied law at University of Königsberg, Bonn, and Berlin and served as an officer in the Prussian Army, resigning in 1865.

In 1874 he entered the Prussian House of Lords and in 1878-81 and 1886-98 was a member of the Reichstag and a prominent figure in the German Conservative Party, taking a foremost part in economic and agrarian reforms, acting as leader of the Steuer-und Wirtschaftsreformer (1879 et seq.). He was created Count in 1888.
