= Botanical Garden, Potsdam =

Botanical garden and arboretum in Potsdam, Germany

Coordinates: 52.4042°N 13.0255°E

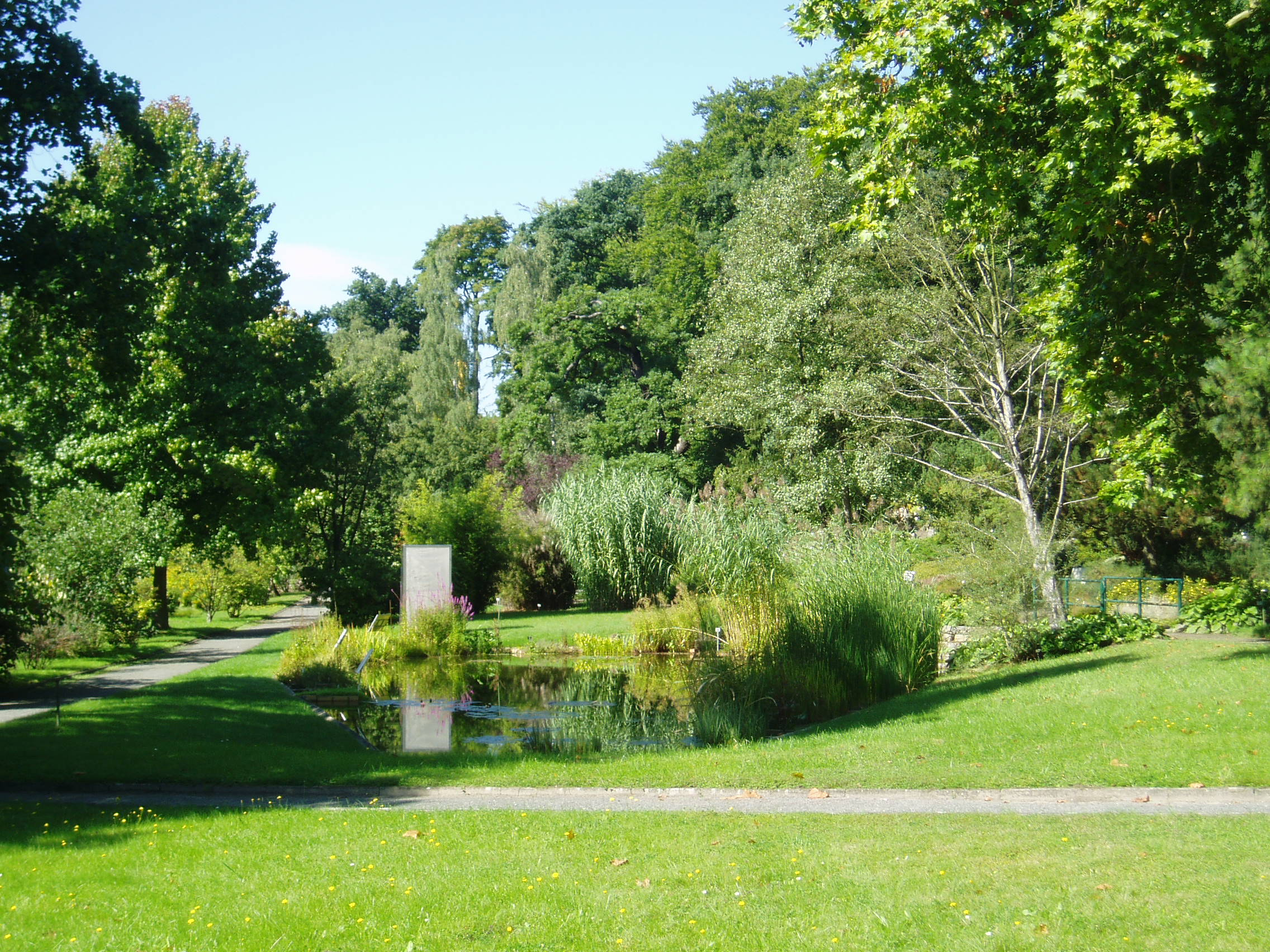
Botanical Garden, Potsdam

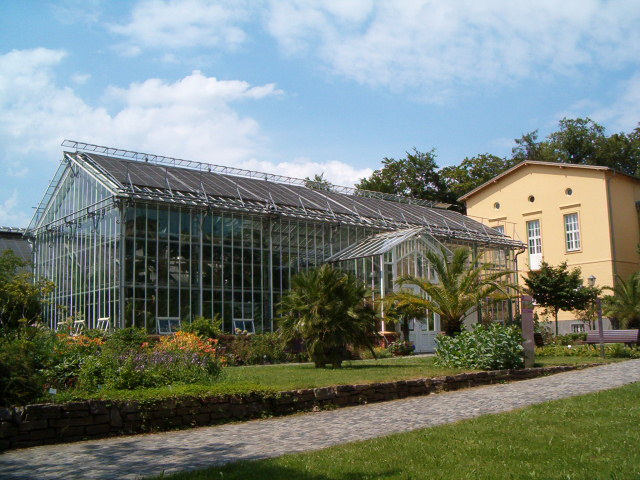
Palm house

The Botanical Garden in Potsdam (German: Botanischer Garten Potsdam or Botanischer Garten der Universität Potsdam), is a botanical garden and arboretum maintained by the University of Potsdam. It has a total area of 8.5 hectares, of which 5 hectares are open to the public, and is located immediately southwest of the Orangery Palace at Maulbeerallee 2, Potsdam, in the German state of Brandenburg. It is open daily; an admission fee is charged for the glasshouses only (2017).

The garden was established in 1950 on two adjacent plots of land: part of the Sanssouci Park, and the Paradise Garden (about 2.5 hectares). After World War II, the Sanssouci park was controlled by the Red Army, and briefly formed a branch of the Moscow Botanical Garden of Academy of Sciences. In 1950 today's garden was created at the northern edge of Sanssouci with the Maulbeerallee dividing the garden into two distinct areas. To the north is the Paradise Garden, now a teaching and display garden; and to the south side is the institute building, greenhouses, and outdoor space.

Today the garden cultivates about 9,000 taxa, with excellent collections of succulents (880), Begoniaceae (89 spp.), Araceae (c.250 spp.), Aizoaceae (c.260 spp.), Haworthia (55 spp.), ferns (230), Australian Proteaceae, orchids (320), chimaeras, invasive species, and Chinese medical herbs.

The garden cultivates about 4,000 taxa outdoors, including 50 species from Brandenburg that are threatened with extinction. Major outdoor sections include an arboretum; collections from East Asia and Eurasian steppes; the Central European deciduous forest; North American prairies; an alpine garden; rhododendrons; wild flowers; a rose garden; marsh and aquatic plants; morphological gardens illustrating a variety of leaves, shoots, roots, flowers, and fruit; useful plants including dyeing, fiber, and food crops; medicinal and aromatic plants; and protected and endangered plants from Germany.

The garden's ten greenhouses (approximately 3,000 m^{2} total area) contain about 4,600 tropical and subtropical species in a palm house, epiphyte house, orchid house, fern house, cactus house, aquarium house, Victoria house, etc. These houses also contain coffee and cocoa trees, sugarcane, cotton, cassava, guava, begonias, and carnivorous plants.

== See also ==
- Biosphäre Potsdam
- List of botanical gardens in Germany
