= Karl Wilhelm Bardou =

German portrait painter

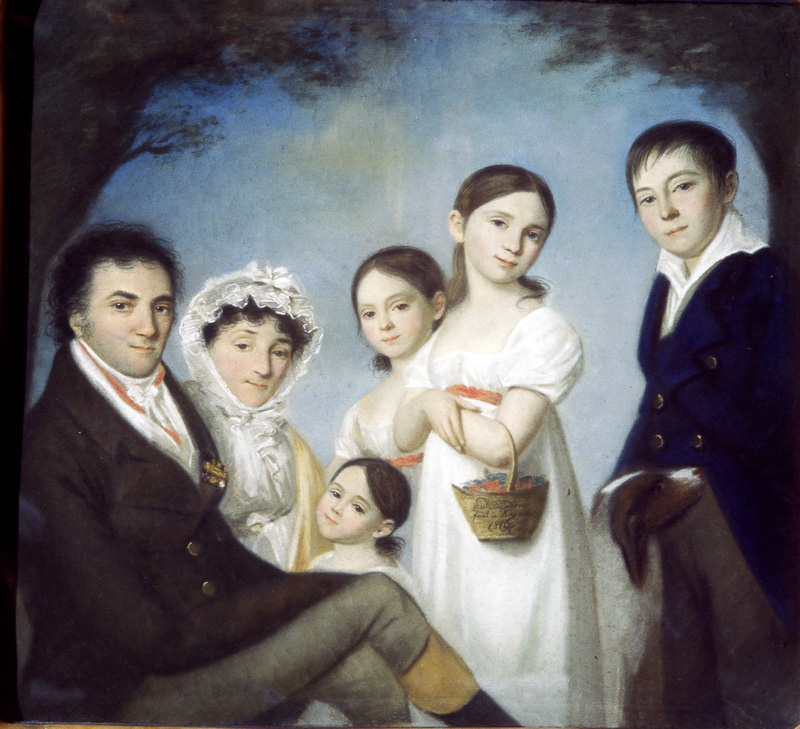
Lev Nikolayevich Engelhardt and his family

Karl Wilhelm Bardou (5 August 1774 – c. 1842) was a German portrait painter who worked in Russia. Pastels were his preferred medium.

== Biography ==
Born in Berlin, he came from a family of artists. His father was the sculptor, Emanuel Bardou, and his uncle was the portrait painter, Paul Joseph Bardou, with whom he studied.

From 1804 to 1827, he was a portrait painter in Russia, mostly in St. Petersburg, Moscow and Kazan. He eventually took Russian citizenship. Approximately 160 of his works have been identified by employees of the Museum of Moscow, held in various museums and private collections. He is often confused with another portrait painter, Johann P. Bardou, who also worked in Russia at a slightly earlier period.

He married a Russian, Anna Iwanowna (1786–1840), who died in Darmstadt following a long illness. They had two sons and a daughter.

By 1831, he had returned to Berlin and exhibited his works there, throughout the mid-1830s and early 1840s. Nothing is known of his life after a showing there in 1842. The first full exhibition of his works was held in 1999 at the Tropinin Museum, and a catalogue raisonné was published.

== Sources ==
- Carl Bardou in: Neil Jeffares, Dictionary of pastellists before 1800 (Online)
- Carl Bardou in: Livejournal Biografie (Online)
