= Laurent Angliviel de la Beaumelle =

French writer

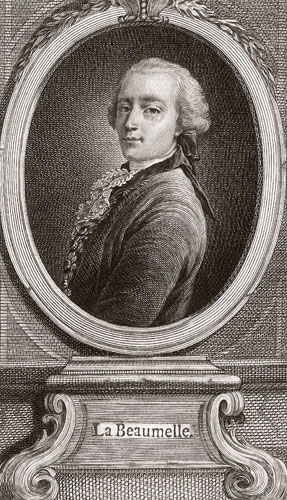
Laurent Angliviel de La Beaumelle

Laurent Angliviel de la Beaumelle (28 January 1726 in Valleraugue – 17 November 1773 in Gard) was a French Protestant writer.

== Life ==
His father was a merchant and protestant and his mother, Susanne d'Arnal (1696-1729) was catholic and died in 1729, when La Beaumelle was 3 years old.

La Beaumelle was a brilliant student in Alès and stayed there for eight years (1734–42). He joined the Reformed Church in 1744. In 1745 he went to Geneva; the next year he joined the Freemasons. In 1747 he went to Denmark and wrote Traité sur la tolérance, and L'Asiatique tolérant, ou traité à l'usage de Zeokinizul, roi des Kofirans, surnommé le Chéri published in Amsterdam in 1749. Then he was appointed as professor of French literature at the University of Copenhagen. In 1751 he received almost simultaneously with Voltaire, an invitation by the Prussian King Frederick the Great to come to Sanssouci in Potsdam. Beaumelle fell out with "La Voltaire" and he went back to Paris, visiting Gotha and Frankfurt, in 1752 with deadly hatred of Voltaire.

Because of his "Notes sur le siècle de Louis XIV", La Beaumelle was arrested on 24 April and imprisoned in the Bastille till 12 October 1753. In 1755 he went to Holland and met with Henri de Catt and Marc-Michel Rey. Soon after his return to Paris, the publication of his Mémoires de la Maintenon brought him again for a year in jail (September 1757). Voltaire seems both times to have been involved. After his release, La Beaumelle settled down as a freelance writer in Toulouse (1759), but without permission to leave the Languedoc. La Beaumelle got involved in the case of Jean Calas. In 1764 he married Rose-Victoire Lavaysse. Their daughter Aglaé was born in 1768. Around 1770 King Louis XV appointed him at the Bibliothèque Royale, and granted him a pension.

== Reception ==
Most of his writings bear a polemical, pamphlet-like character or speculate (as contained in the "Memoirs of Madame de Maintenon") on the audience's curiosity. His best writing is unquestionably "Reponse au Supplément du siècle de Louis XIV, ou Lettres à Voltaire" (1754, 1763), by wit, spirit and energy the most distinguished. His worst is the "Commentaire sur la Henriade" (1775), a very model of inept, pathetic criticism.

== Personal life ==
At the age of 42, on the 6th of September 1768, he had a daughter Aglaé Angliviel de La Beaumelle, who in 1794 married Jean-Antoine Gleizes and lived until her old age in Lavelanet castle, dying at Nogarède castle on the 25th of March 1853. His son-in-law's brother colonel Gleizes was a member of the General Counsel of Haute-Garonne. Upon his death in 1773, Laurent Angliviel de la Beaumelle was also survived by his widow Victoire Rose Lavayesse (1733-1813), his brother-in-law Gaubert Lavaysse, who was involved in Calas affair and died in 1786, and by his older brother Jean Angliviel (1723-1812). His son Victor Laurent Suzanne Moïse Angliviel de La Beaumelle (1772 in Mazères -1831 in Rio de Janeiro) became a well-known writer and mathematician, as well as the author of the "History of the Empire of Brazil".

In 1853, his nephew Maurice Jean Marie Angliviel (28 October 1779 - 6 March 1876), a son of Jean Angliviel, published an apologia of Laurent Angliviel de La Beaumelle titled "The Observations on the Writing of Mr. Ch. Nisard against L. Angliviel de La Beaumelle."

== Works ==
- Traité sur la tolérance
- L'Asiatique tolérant, ou traité à l'usage de Zeokinizul, roi des Kofirans, surnommé le Chéri
- Mes pensées. Copenhagen 1751 (Glogau 1754)
- Notes sur le siècle de Louis XIV (an annotated version of Voltaire's Le Siècle de Louis XIV
- Mémoires de la Maintenon. Amsterdam 1755/56 (9 vols.)
- Commentaire sur la Henriade
- Reponse au Supplément du siècle de Louis XIV, ou Lettres à Voltaire

== Literature ==
- Michel Nicolas: Sur la vie et les écrits de Laurent Angliviel de La Beaumelle. Cherbuliez, Paris 1852.
- La Beaumelle, Laurent Angliviel de: Correspondence générale de La Beaumelle / éd. par Hubert Bost ... . - Oxford : Voltaire Foundation, 2005–2012.
- Claude Lauriol, Études sur La Beaumelle (Paris: Editions Honoré Champion, 2008) (Vie des Huguenots, 42).
