= Sorkwity =

- Village
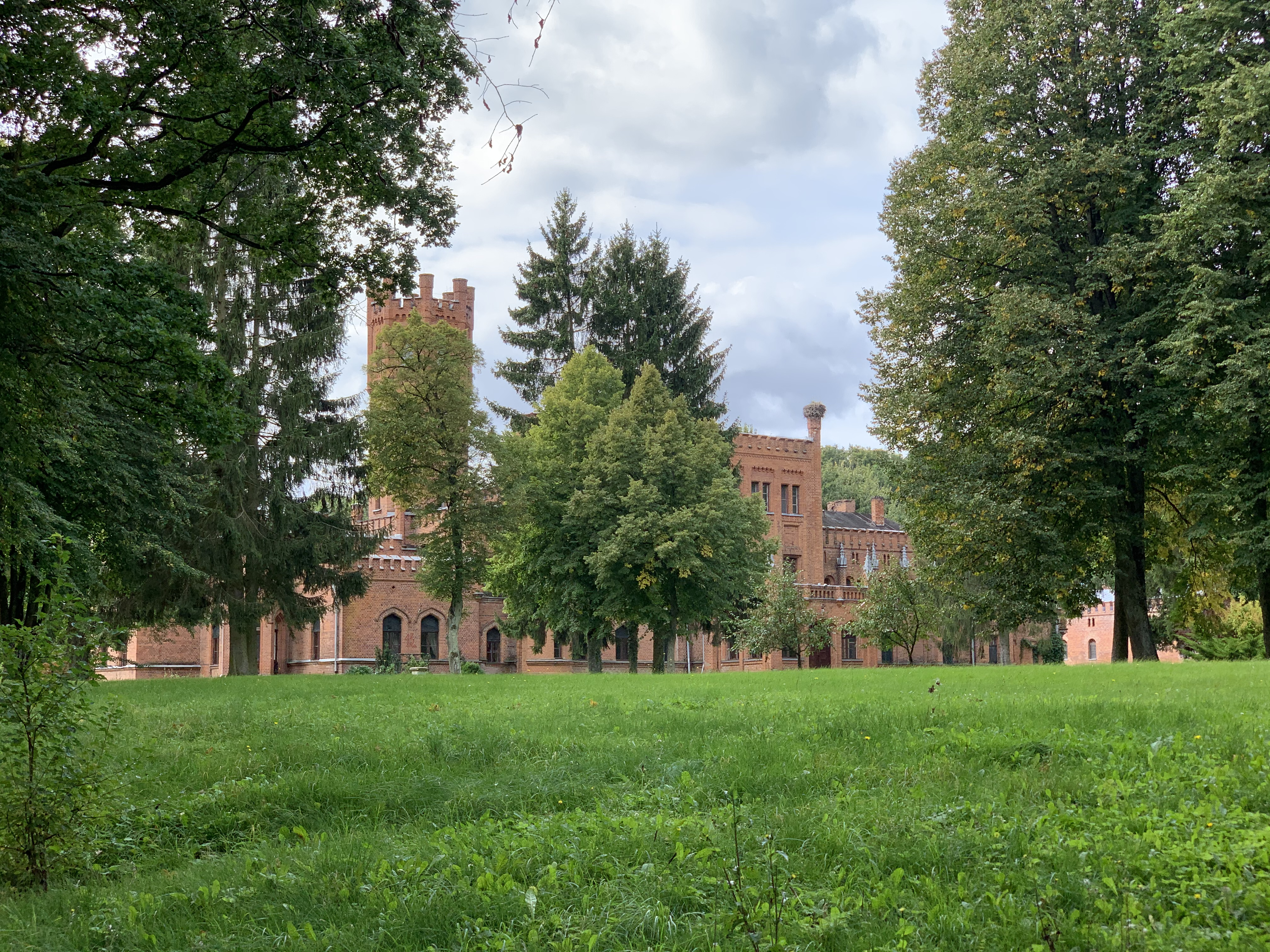
- Palace in Sorkwity

- Location within Poland
- Coordinates: 53°50′42″N 21°8′35″E
- Country: Poland
- Voivodeship: Warmian-Masurian
- County: Mrągowo
- Gmina: Sorkwity

Population
  - Total: 770
- Time zone: UTC+1 (CET)
  - Summer (DST): UTC+2 (CEST)
- Vehicle registration: NMR

Sorkwity [sɔrkˈfitɨ] (German: Sorquitten) is a village in Mrągowo County, Warmian-Masurian Voivodeship, in northern Poland. It is the seat of the gmina (administrative district) called Gmina Sorkwity. It is located between the Gielądzkie and Lampackie lakes in the historic region of Masuria.

== History ==
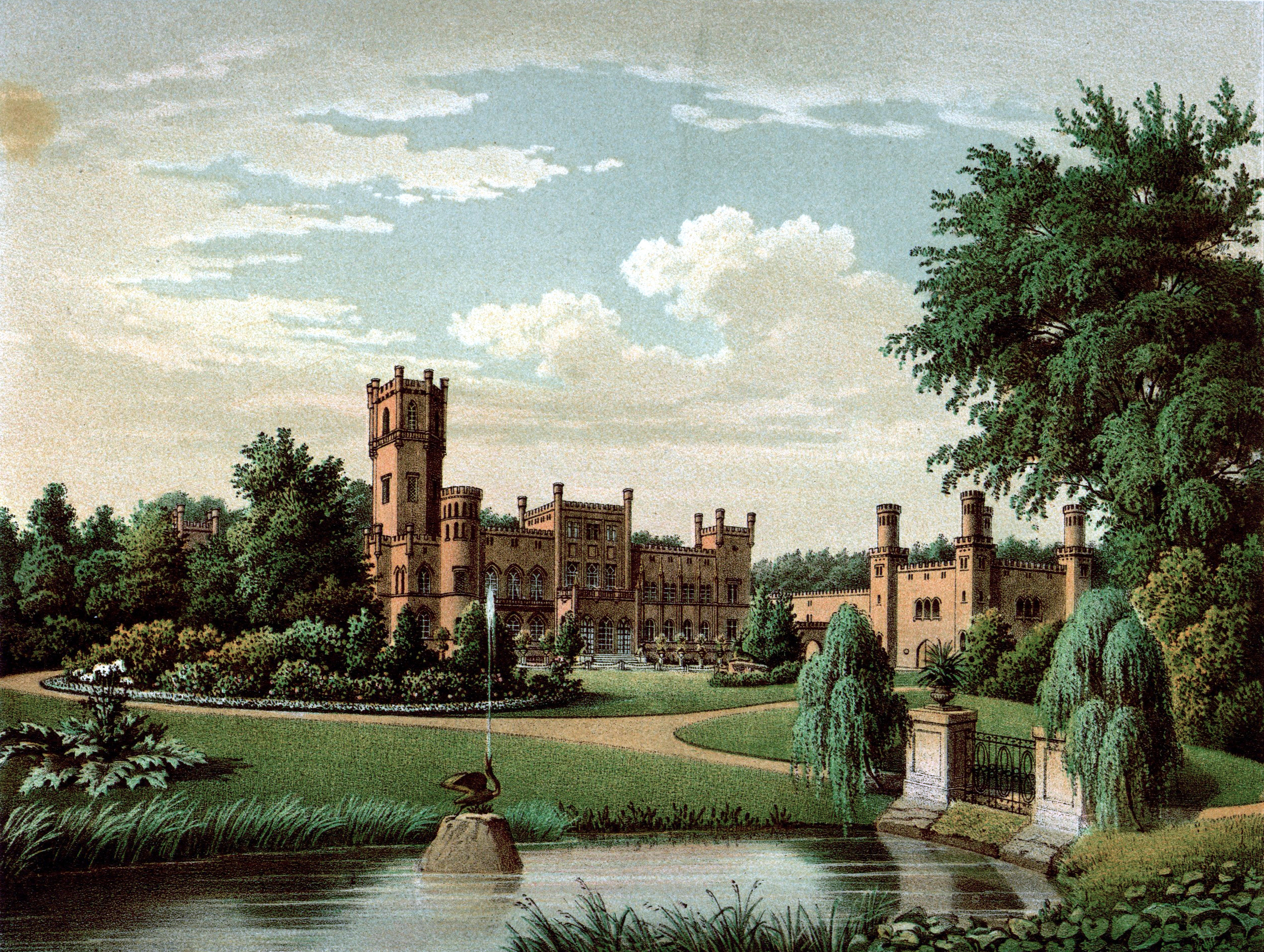
19th-century view of the palace

Sarkewitte was founded in 1379 by Winrich von Kniprode, the Grand Master of the Teutonic Order, for the brothers Christian and Otto von Oelsen. In 1454, the region was incorporated by King Casimir IV Jagiellon into the Kingdom of Poland upon the request of the anti-Teutonic Prussian Confederation. After the subsequent Thirteen Years' War, since 1466, it formed part of Poland as a fief held by the Teutonic Order, and after 1525 held by Ducal Prussia. The first preacher of the local Protestant parish was ethnic Pole Maciej Wannowius, from 1547 to 1589. From 1701 it formed part of the Kingdom of Prussia; from 1871 it was also part of Germany, within which it was administratively located in the province of East Prussia. The estate had many different owners. In 1804, the von Mirbach family acquired Sarkewitte/Sorquitten. The family build a neogothic palace in the village between 1850 and 1856. In the late 19th century, the village had a predominantly Polish population of 431, which was mostly employed in agriculture and cattle breeding.

After the defeat of Nazi Germany in World War II the village again became part of Poland by the Potsdam Agreement. Most Germans fled or were expelled in accordance with the Potsdam Agreement, and the remaining Polish population was joined by Poles expelled from the eastern Polish areas annexed by the Soviet Union or Ukrainians forced to settle in the area through Operation Vistula in 1947.

== Notable residents ==
- Johann Goercke (1750-1822), German surgeon
- Julius von Mirbach (1839–1921), German politician
