= Botanical Garden of the University of Innsbruck =

Botanical garden in Austria

Coordinates: 47.2678°N 11.3798°E

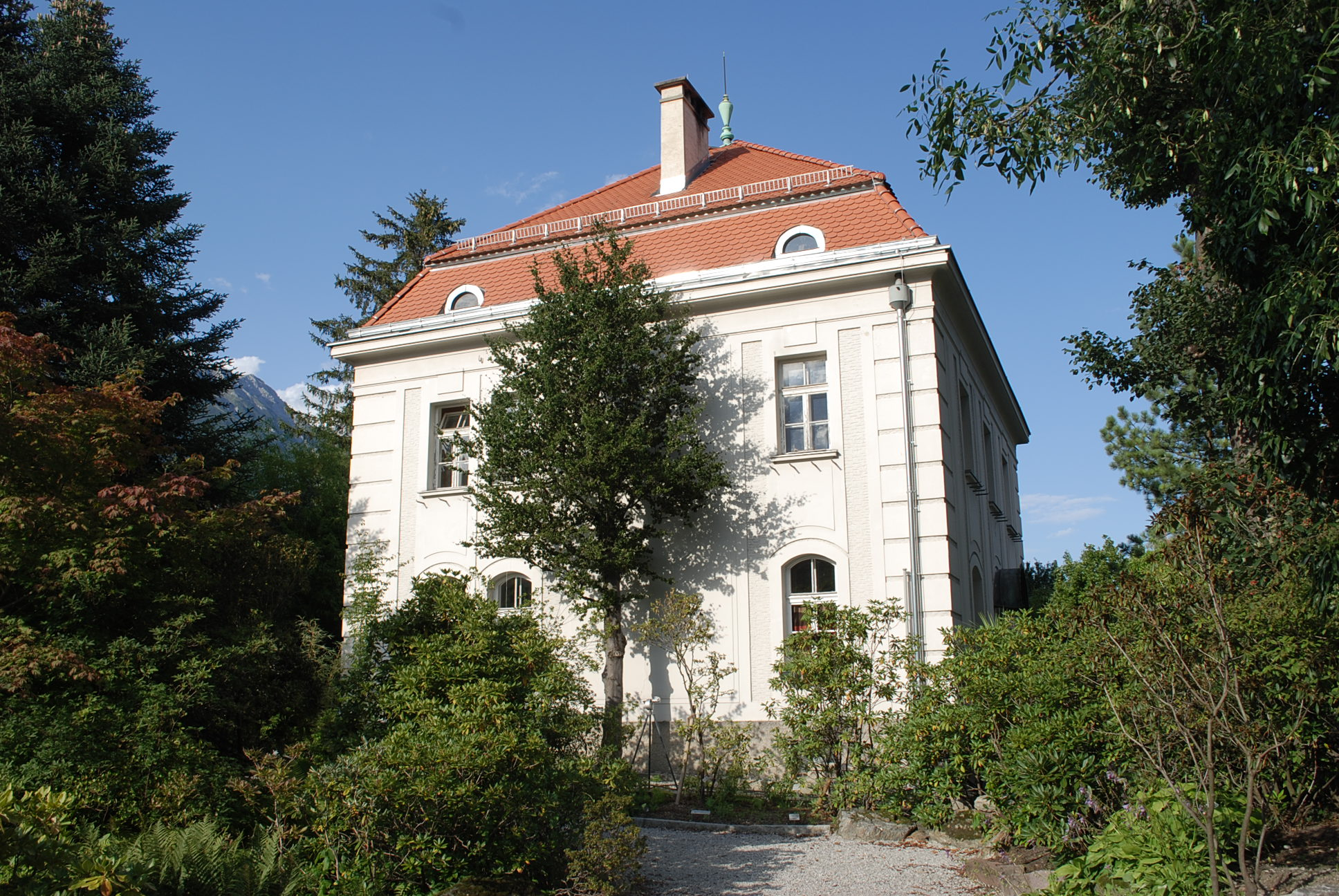
Botanical Garden of the University of Innsbruck administration building

The Botanical Garden of the University of Innsbruck (German: Botanischer Garten der Universität Innsbruck) is a 2-hectare botanical garden operated by the University of Innsbruck. It is located in Hötting at Sternwartestraße 15, Innsbruck, Austria. The gardens are open at no cost every day; its greenhouses are open on Thursday afternoons for an admission fee.

The garden was established around 1911, replacing an earlier garden elsewhere. It was redesigned between 1948 and 1965, and its alpine rock garden was revised 1987–1990 on modern systemic principles. Its first greenhouse was constructed in 1909, with three additional greenhouses added 1977–1979, a succulent house in 1993, and a sixth greenhouse for container plants built in 1997.

Today the garden contains more than 5000 species organized within the following major sections:

- Alpinum (more than 2000 m^{2}) - a major alpine garden, divided geographically and geologically, containing more than 1000 plants from all, non tropical, alpine regions of the world. Includes an area for ferns, a moor, and four ponds.
- Arboretum - woody plants including Gymnosperms, Angiosperms, and perennial plants.
- Cactus houses (330 m^{2}) - about 500 cactus species.
- Cactus-Succulent-Mediterranean House (280 m^{2}) - primarily plants from the Mediterranean, the Canary Islands, the colder regions of Australia and New Zealand, as well as African succulent plants and American cacti.
- Fern house (70 m^{2}) - epiphytes, climbing ferns, and water ferns.
- Fragrance and touch garden (built 1999) - the first in Austria, all plants labeled in Braille.
- Medicinal, poisonous, and spice plants - more than 300 plants ordered by their effective substances (alkaloids, glycocholic acid, tannins, ethereal oils, vitamins, etc.
- Orchid house
- Succulent house - over 550 succulent plants, mainly from South Africa, the Canary Islands, and South America.
- Systematic garden (1000 m^{2}, rebuilt 1993)
- Tropical greenhouse (287 m^{2}, height above 12 m^{2}) - flowering and useful tropical plants.

== See also ==
- Alpengarten Patscherkofel, the university's alpine garden atop Patscherkofel
- List of botanical gardens

== Gallery ==
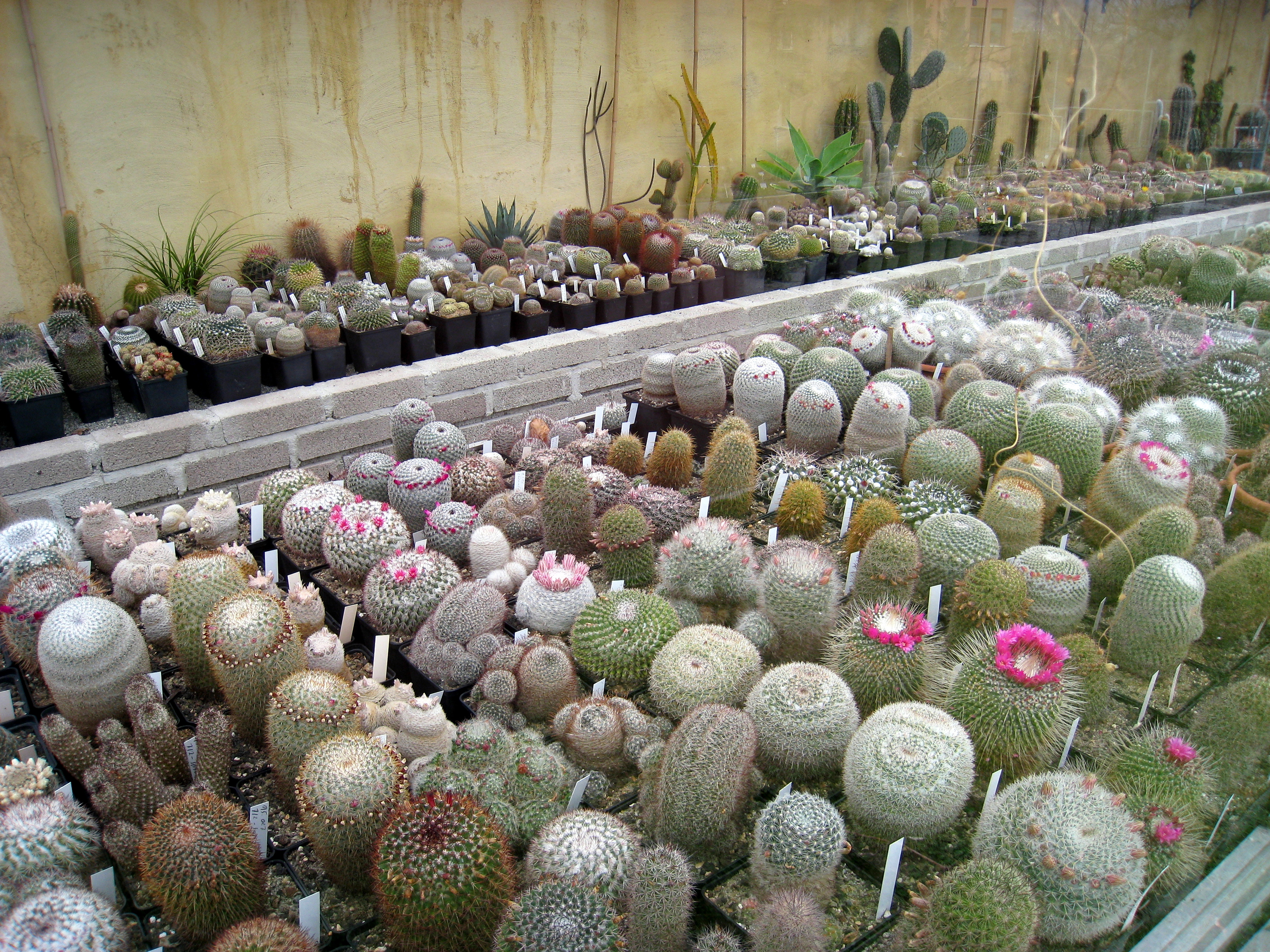
Cactus house

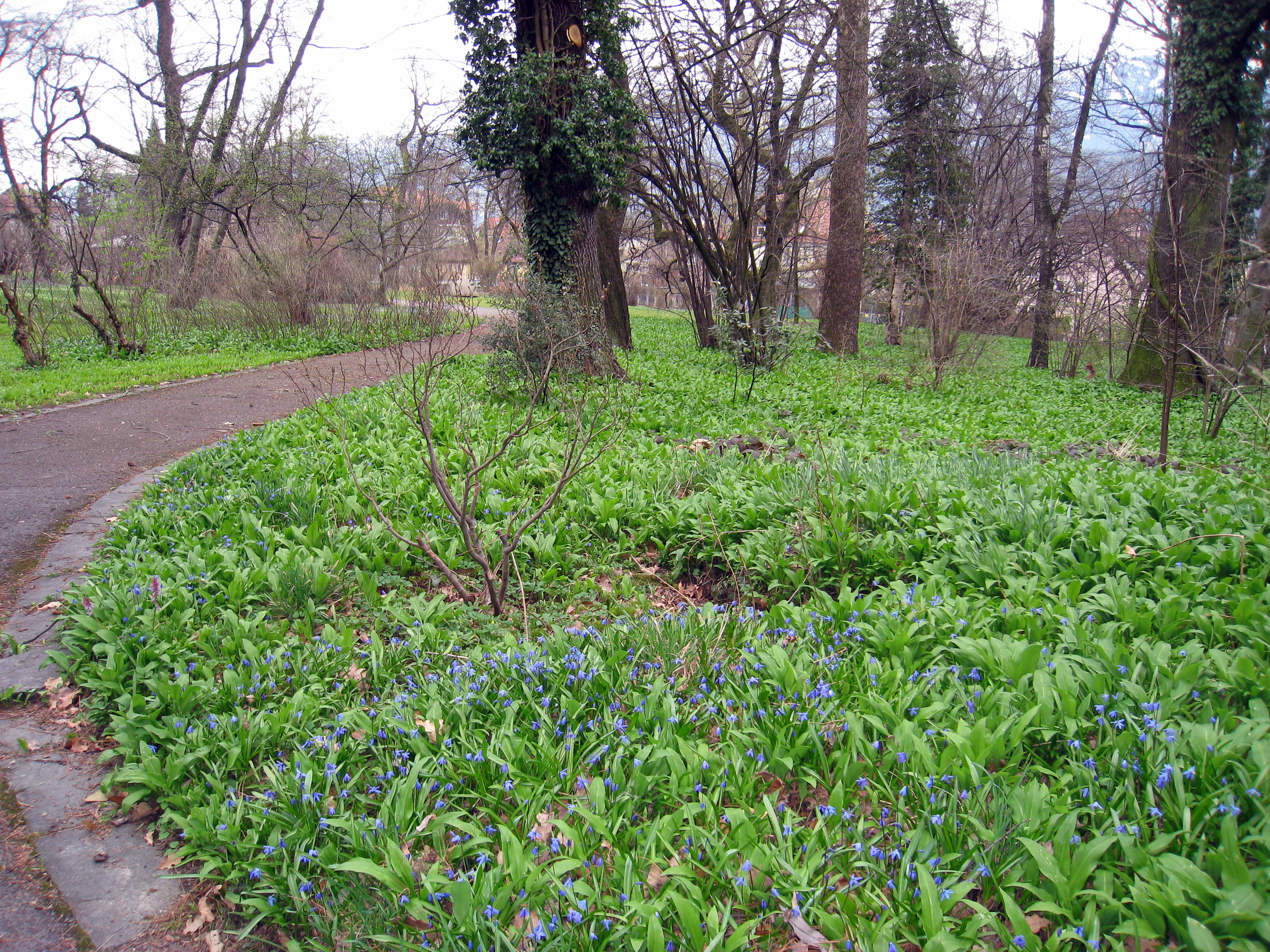
Arboretum

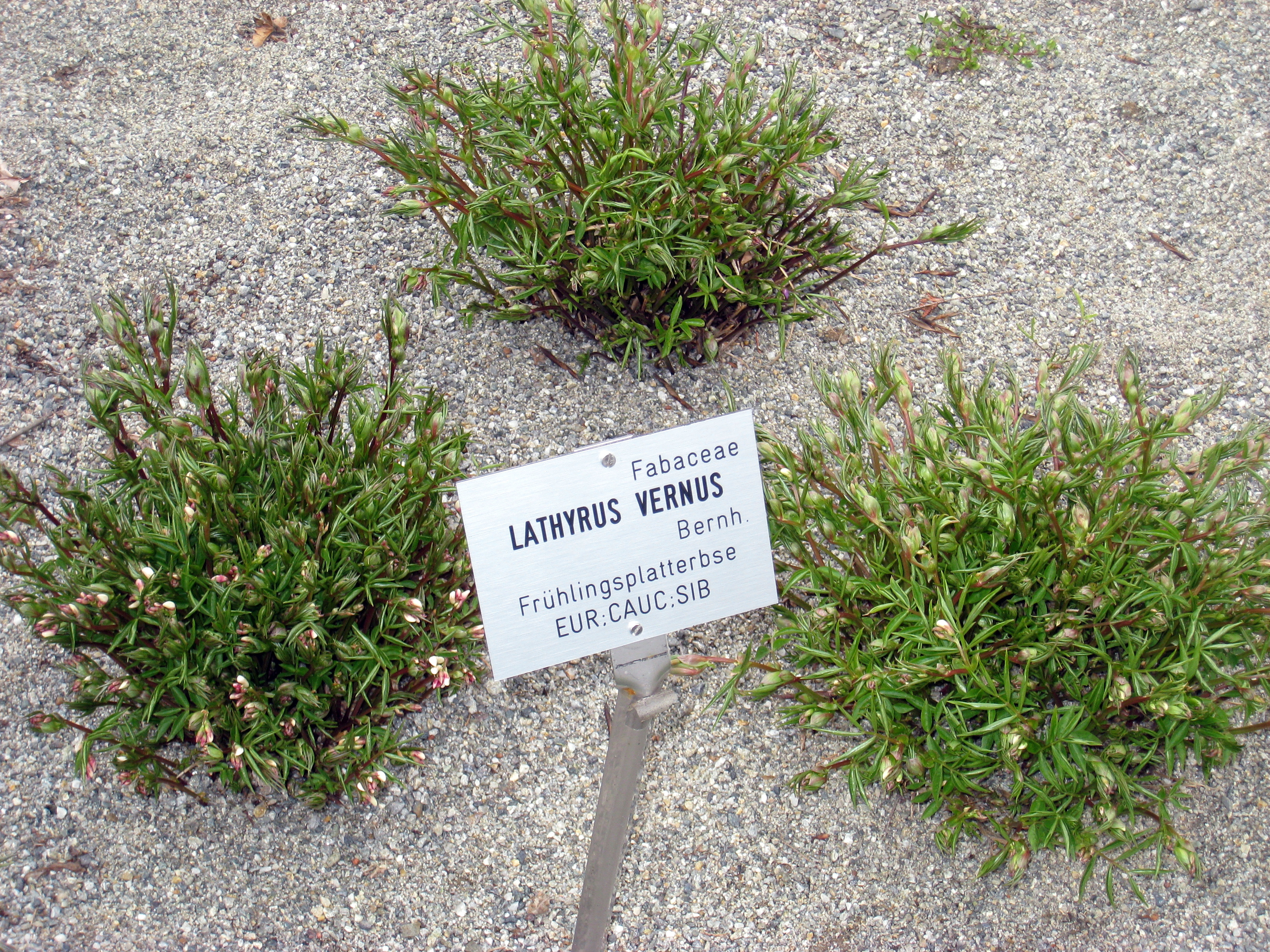
Lathyrus vernus

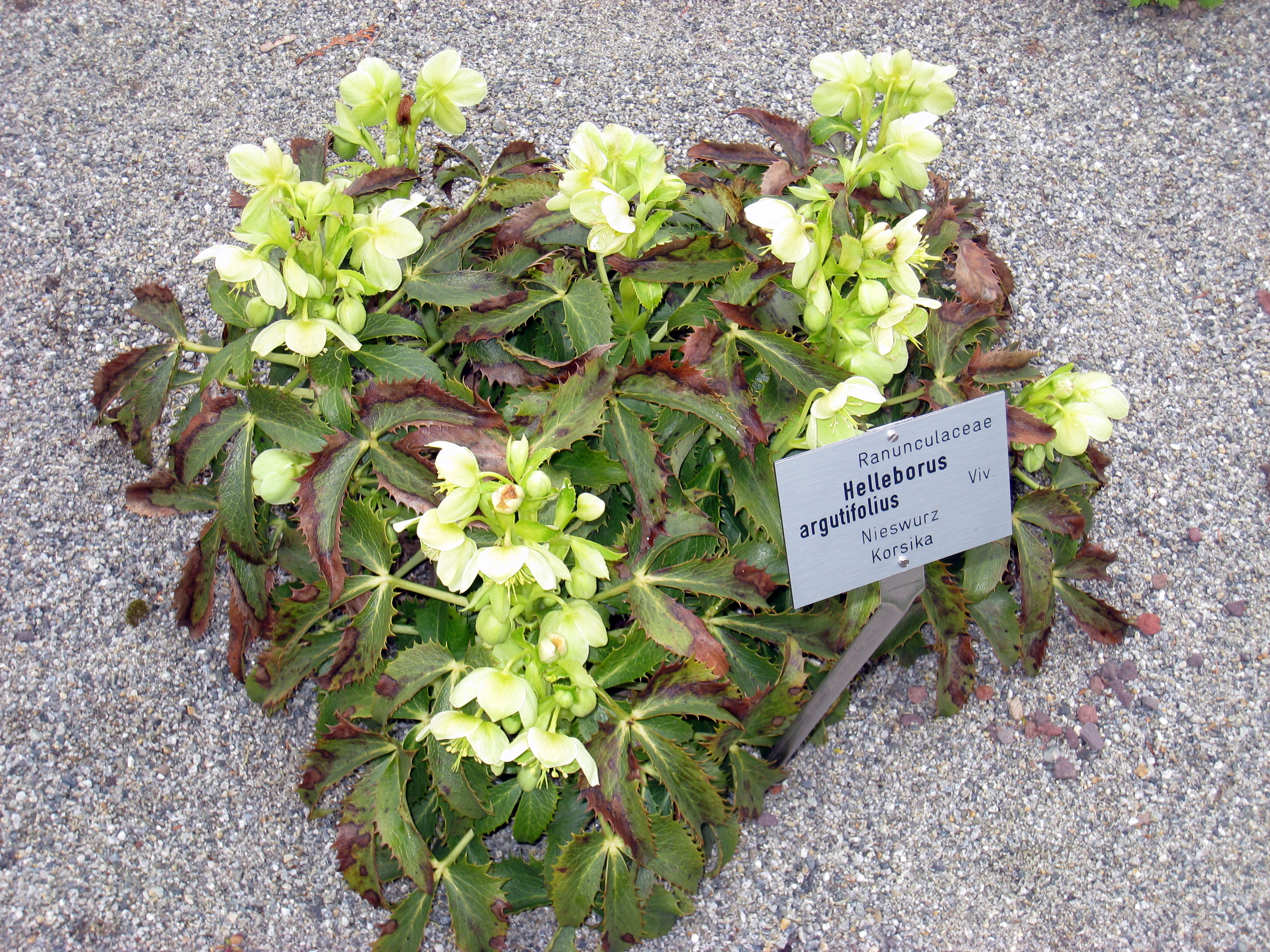
Helleborus argutifolius

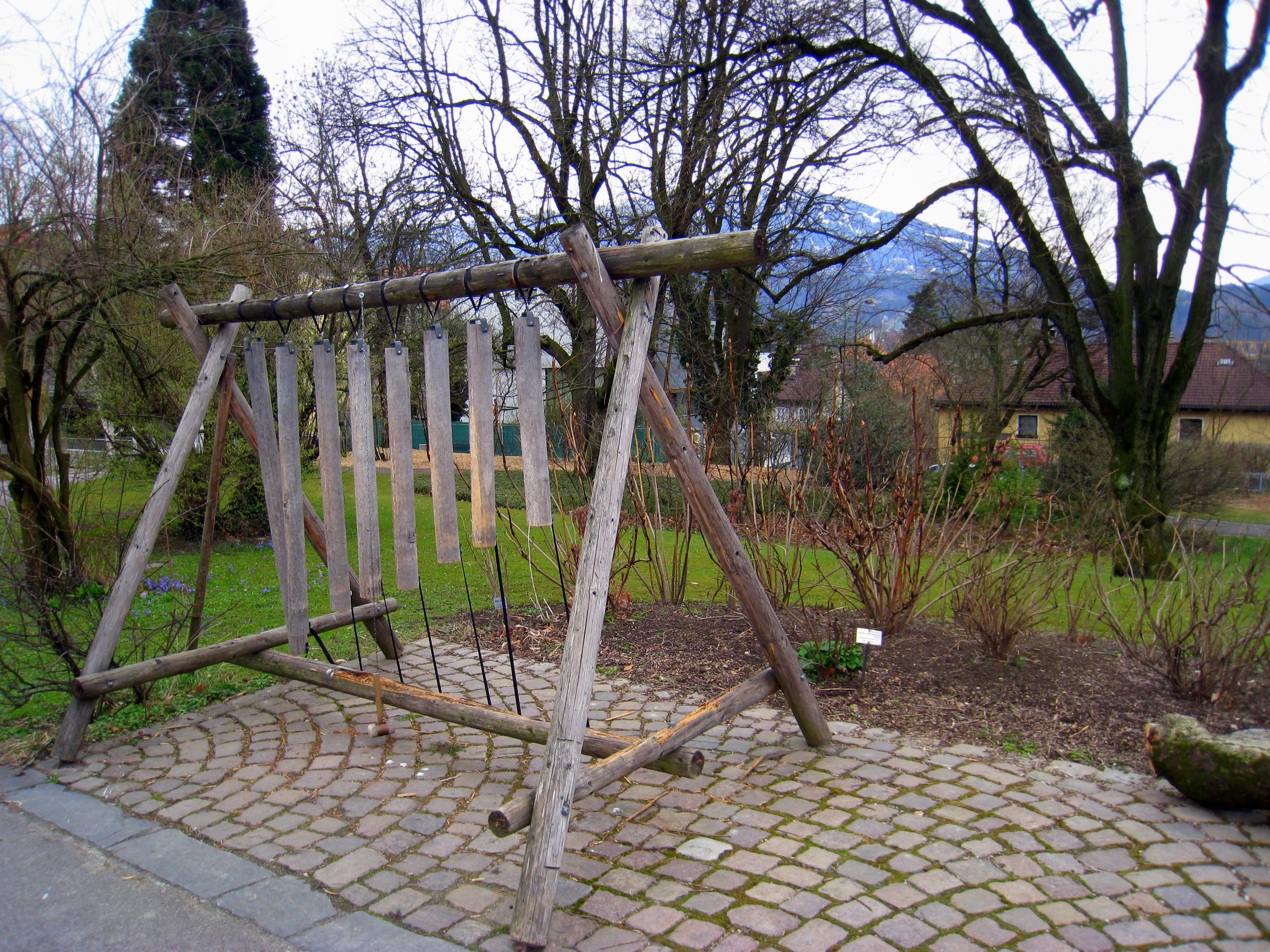
Musical instrument
