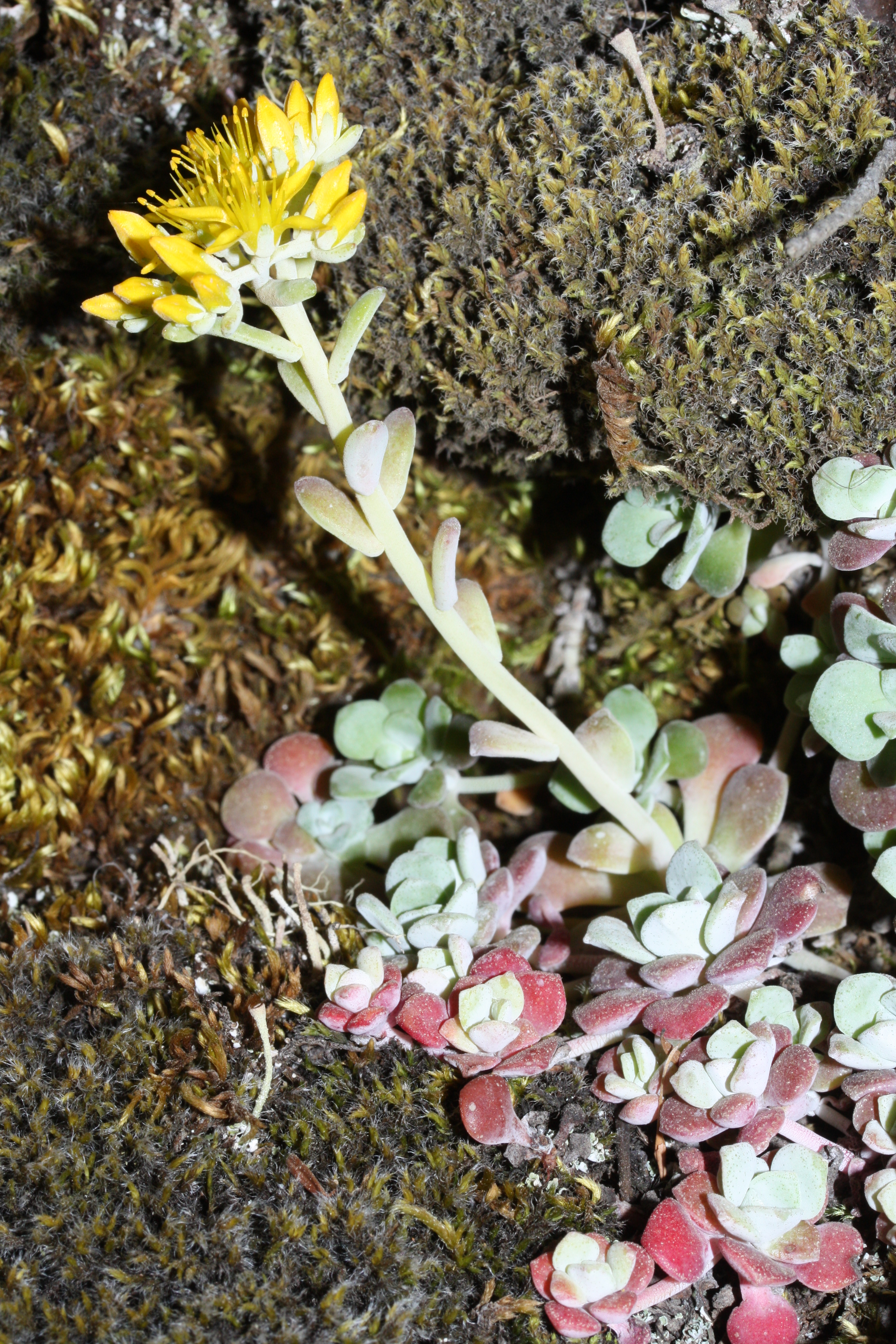

Scientific classification
- Kingdom: Plantae
- Clade: Tracheophytes
- Clade: Angiosperms
- Clade: Eudicots
- Order: Saxifragales
- Family: Crassulaceae
- Genus: Sedum
- Species: S. spathulifolium

Binomial name
- Sedum spathulifolium Hook.

= Sedum spathulifolium =

Species of succulent

Sedum spathulifolium is a species of flowering plant in the family Crassulaceae known by the common names broadleaf stonecrop, yellow stonecrop, and spoon-leaved stonecrop. An evergreen perennial, it is native to western North America from British Columbia to southern California, where it can be found often in shade in many types of rocky habitat in coastal and inland hills and mountains.

== Description ==
In general, Sedum spathulifolium is a succulent plant producing mats of basal rosettes from a system of rhizomes. The basal leaves are 1 or 2 centimeters long. They are sometimes coated in a waxy, powdery looking exudate. The inflorescence is a short, erect array of many small flowers with five yellow petals. When in fruit, the five carpels are separate at the apex and connected at base.

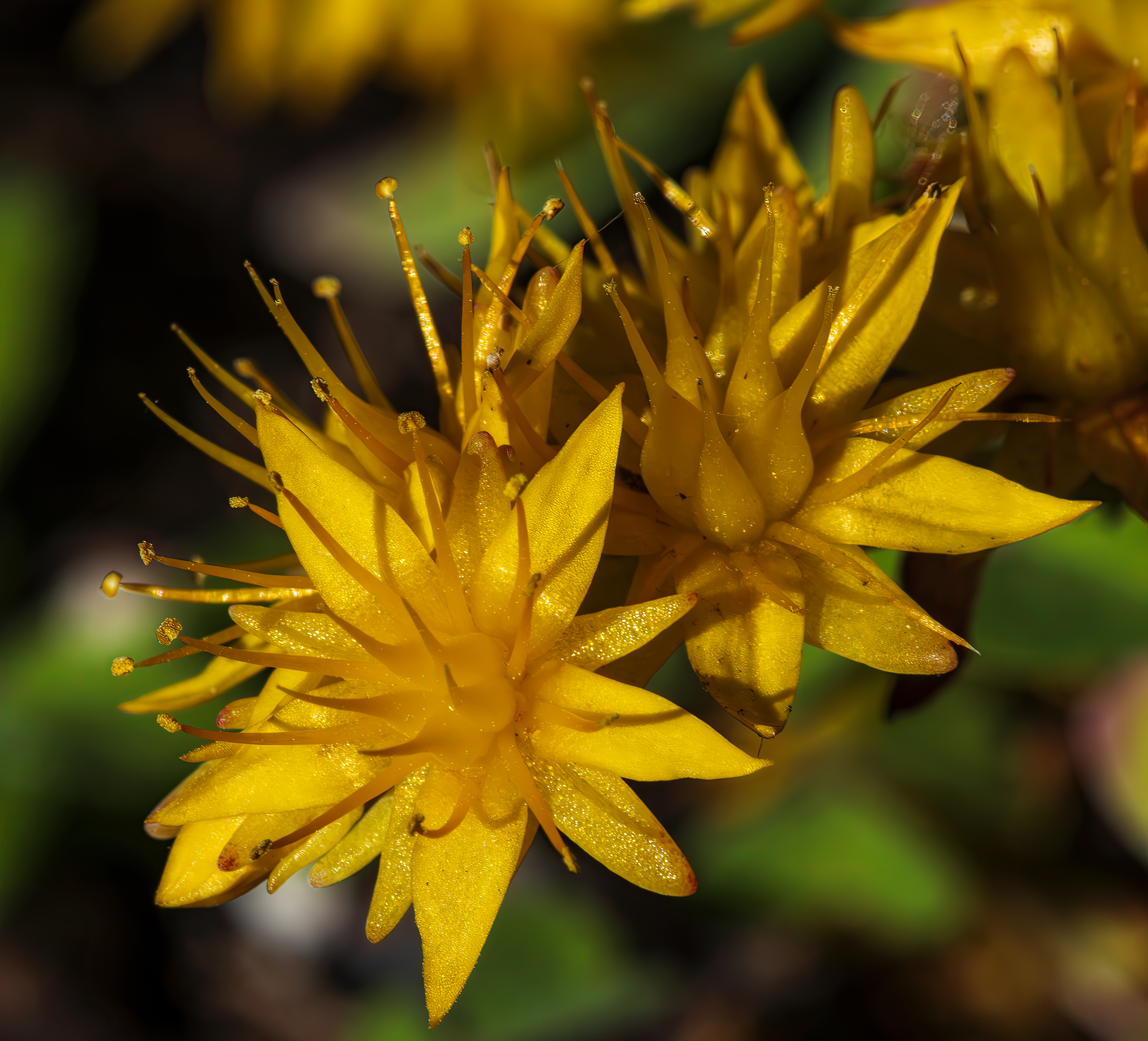
Flower

== Etymology ==
The specific epithet spathulifolium refers to the spade-shaped leaves.

== Taxonomy ==
Sedum spathulifolium is a widespread stonecrop species exhibiting highly variable morphologies throughout its distribution range. While some early literature such as Clausen and Uhl (1944) recognized three subspecies, more recent literature and databases such as the Flora of North America and Plants of the World Online recognized only two varieties.

Clausen and Uhl (1944):

- Sedum spathulifolium subsp. pruinosum (Britton) Clausen & Uhl Foliage often present on both the flowering branch and the basal rosette, typically heavily pruinose (covered by a layer of white, waxy powder) and are thicker (0.2-0.3 cm).
- Sedum spathulifolium subsp. typicum Foliage often restricted to the basal rosette part, typically green or glaucous (not pruinose) and are thinner (1.4-2.1mm). Flower larger than that of subsp. anomalum (0.8-1.7 cm in diameter).
- Sedum spathulifolium subsp. anomalum (Britton) Clausen & Uhl Foliage often restricted to the basal rosette part and devoid of white, waxy, powdery covering; margin slightly wavy. Flowers smaller than that of subsp. typicum (0.7-1.1 cm in diameter).

Flora of America:

- Sedum spathulifolium var. pruinosum (Britton) B.Bolivin Primary rosette narrower in diameter (1.5-2.1 cm). Foliage typically covered by a thick layer of white powdery waxy overcast and are thicker (2.1-2.5mm). Flowers slightly larger in diameter (1-1.2 cm)
- Sedum spathulifolium var. spathulifolium Primary rosette wider in diameter (2.5-3.7 cm). Foliage typically green or glaucous (do not have a thick white powdery waxy powdery covering) and are thinner (1.4-2.1mm). Flowers slightly larger in diameter (1.2-1.6 cm).

== Cultivation ==
This plant is useful as ornamental groundcover in well-drained soil in full sun or partial shade. It dislikes winter wet. Numerous cultivars have been selected for garden use, of which 'Cape Blanco' and 'Purpureum' have received the Royal Horticultural Society's Award of Garden Merit.

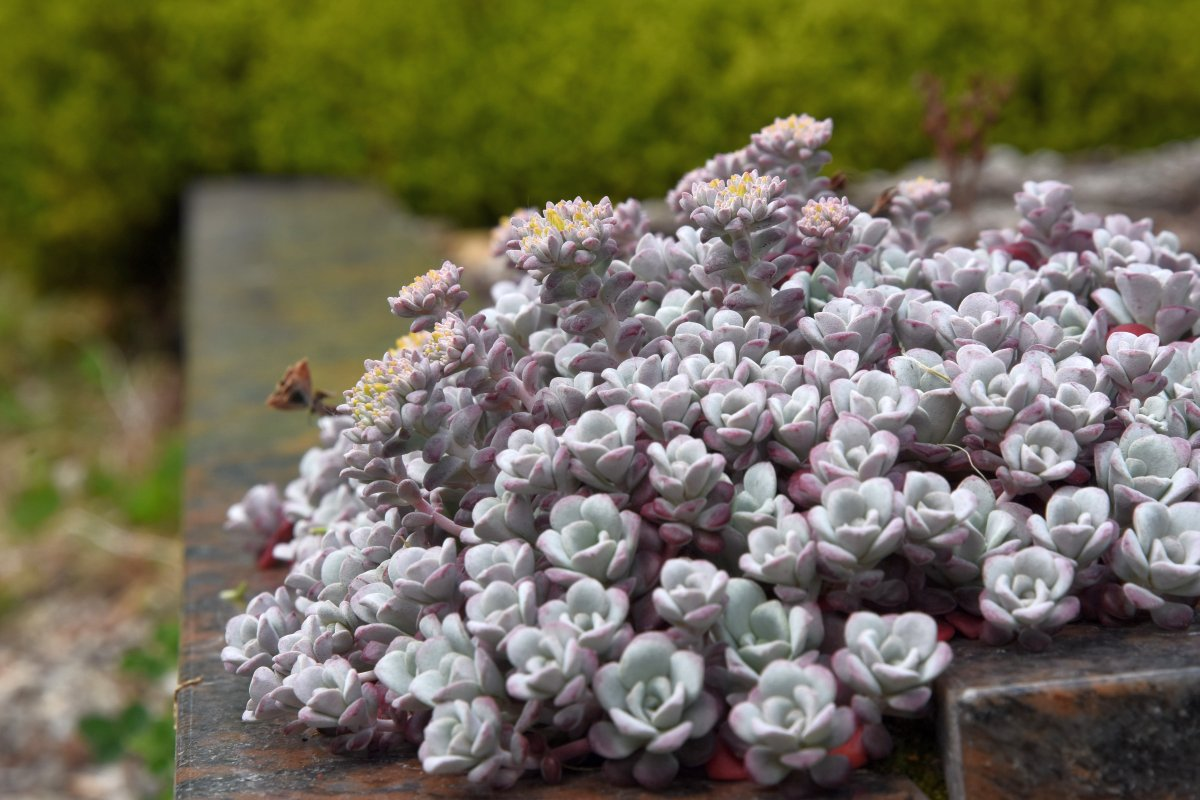
Cultivar of Sedum spathulifolium var. purpureum

== See also ==
- San Bruno elfin butterfly - host plant
