= Johann Goercke =

Prussian army surgeon and author

Johann Friedrich Goercke
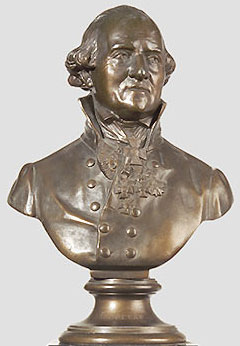
- Born: 3 May 1750
- Died: 30 June 1822
- Other names: Johann Gehrcke
- Occupation: Army surgeon

Johann Friedrich Goercke, (also Gehrcke) (3 May 1750 – 30 June 1822) was a Prussian Army surgeon and author.

== Early life and career ==
Goercke was born in Sorquitten, East Prussia (today Sorkwity, Poland) and became the personal physician of Friedrich II of Prussia. He founded the Pépinière, the first academy for Prussian Army Surgeons in 1795 and became the Chairman of the Prussian Army Medical Corps and the Berlin Charité in 1797.

After the foundation of the University of Berlin in 1809 he became the head of its military surgery section.

== Personal life ==
Goercke died in Potsdam.
