= Biosphäre Potsdam =

Indoor tropical botanical garden in Germany

Coordinates: 52°25′07″N 13°02′59″E

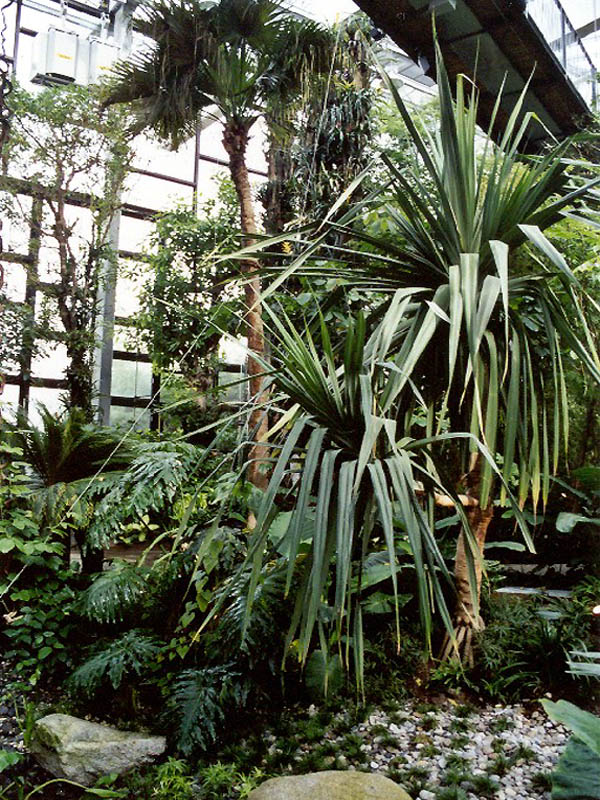
Biosphäre Potsdam

The Biosphäre Potsdam (7,000 m²) is an indoor tropical botanical garden located in the Volkspark Potsdam, a park between the Sanssouci Park and the Neuer Garten Potsdam (New Garden) at Georg-Hermann-Allee 99, Potsdam, Brandenburg, Germany. It is open daily; an admission fee is charged.

The garden contains approximately 20,000 tropical plants representing about 350 species, including orchids, epiphytes, and trees about 14 metres in height, including a palm grove and mangrove swamp. It also includes tropical crops, a waterfall, two lakes, and various types of tropical wildlife, including iguanas, snakes, spiders, frogs, geckos, and pheasants, as well as a butterfly house containing about 30 butterfly species.

== See also ==
- Botanischer Garten Potsdam
- List of botanical gardens in Germany
