= Bornstedt Crown Estate =

Coordinates: 52°25′N 13°02′E

UNESCO World Heritage Site
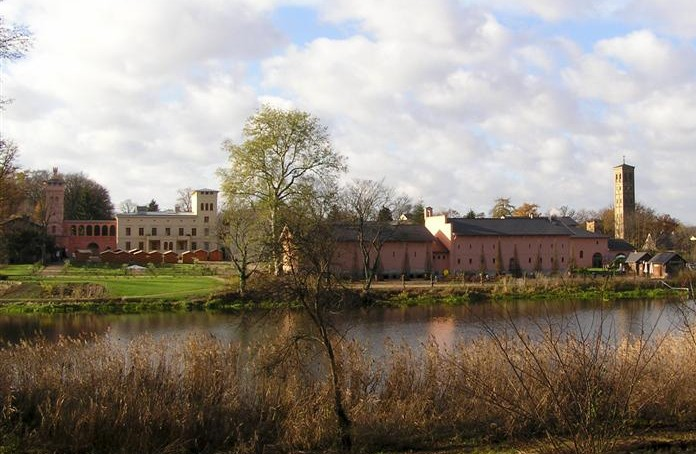
- View of the Estate

- Location within Berlin Location within Germany
- Location: Bornstedt, Potsdam, Brandenburg, Germany
- Part of: Palaces and Parks of Potsdam and Berlin
- Criteria: Cultural: (i)(ii)(iv)
- Reference: 532ter
- Inscription: 1999 (23rd Session)

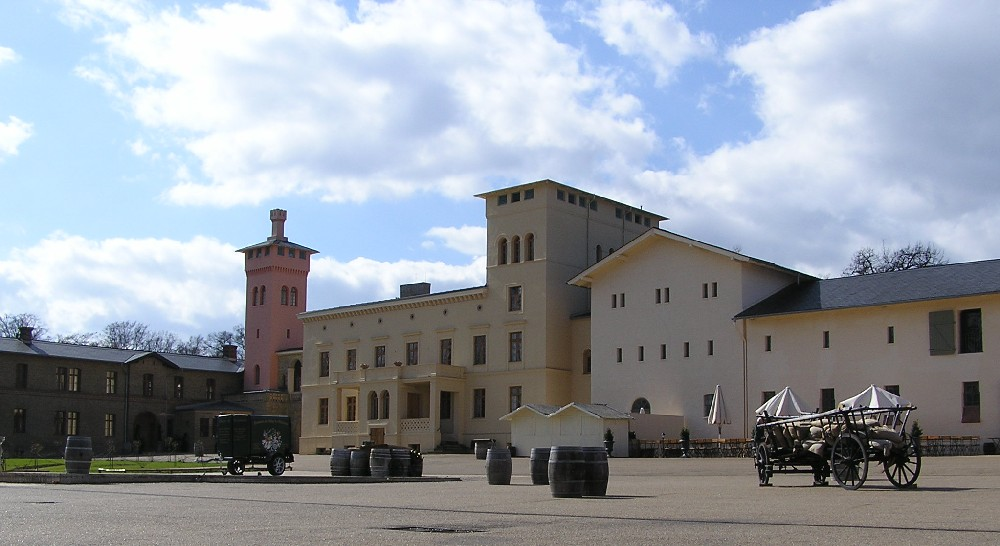
Courtyard

The Bornstedt Crown Estate is a former royal estate and, today, a tourist attraction in the Potsdam borough of Bornstedt. It belongs to the ensemble of palaces and gardens of Sanssouci Park, which is a UNESCO World Heritage Site along with other parks and palaces in the area.

The estate - the former seat of Crown Princess Victoria - is now completely restored and open to the public. It occupies a picturesque location on the shore of the Lake Bornstedt, just 400 metres away from Sanssouci Palace. Its history goes back to 1350.

The Bornstedt Crown Estate is not far from Potsdam city centre. Throughout the year, traditional festivities, markets, and major events take place here. On a tour of the Brandenburg Factory, visitors will learn about more than 21 trades such as pottery and candle making; there is also on-site goldsmith. A barber's shop, bookstore, weaver's and florist complement the wide variety of trades.

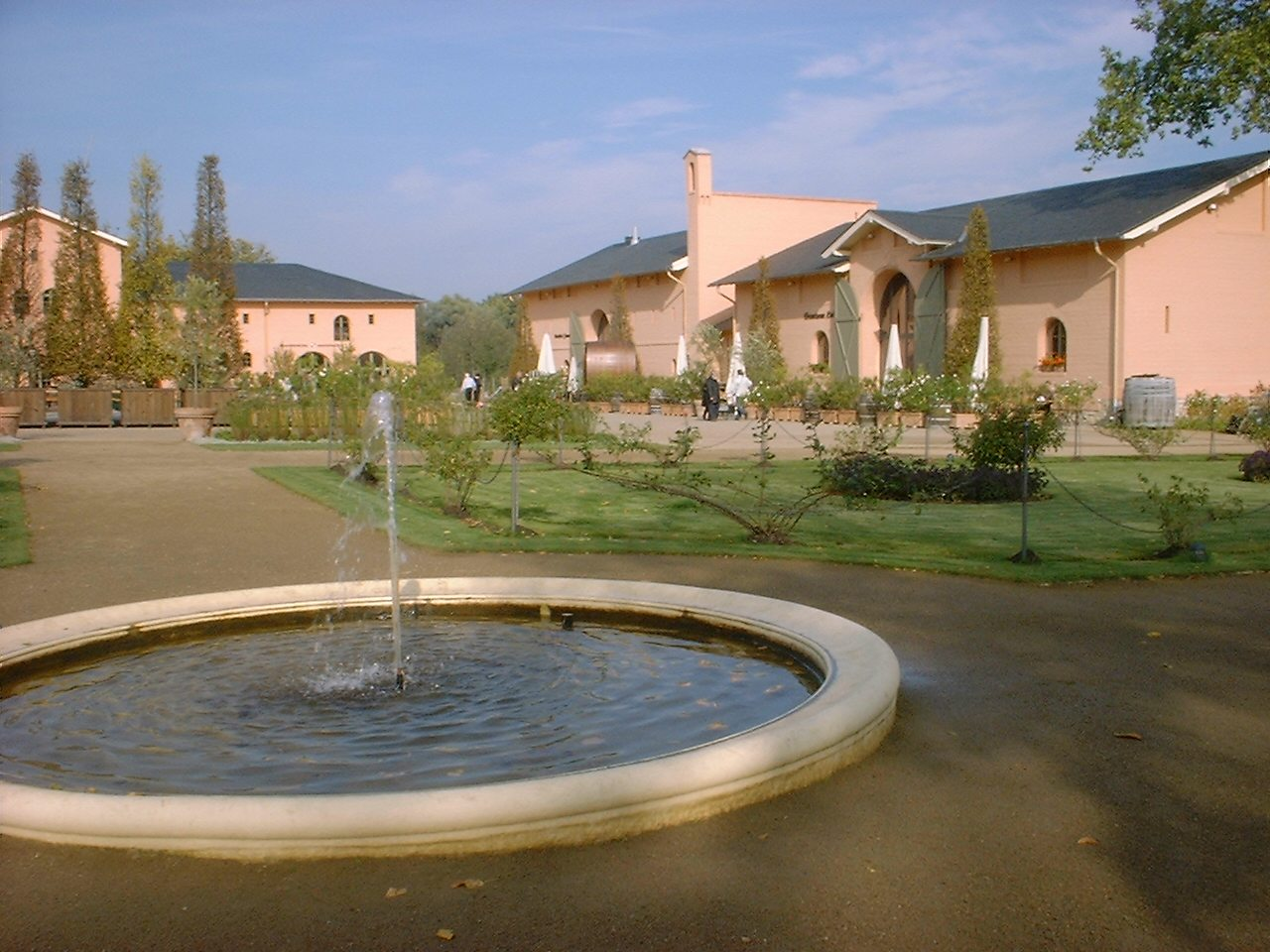
Ornamental garden

Today, a variety of events take place here that are open to the public. Special events include: the historical Christmas market, the drilling and recruiting exercises of the Potsdam Giants, re-enactors wearing the uniforms of Frederick II's Grand Grenadiers, an art market, a farmers' market, beer market, British Days, Crown Estate Spectacular, concerts, plays, exhibitions of the United Buddy Bears - The Minis and even sporting events like the Palaces Marathon, that starts and finishes at the Bornstedt Crown Estate.
