= Otto Ludwig Lange =

German biologist

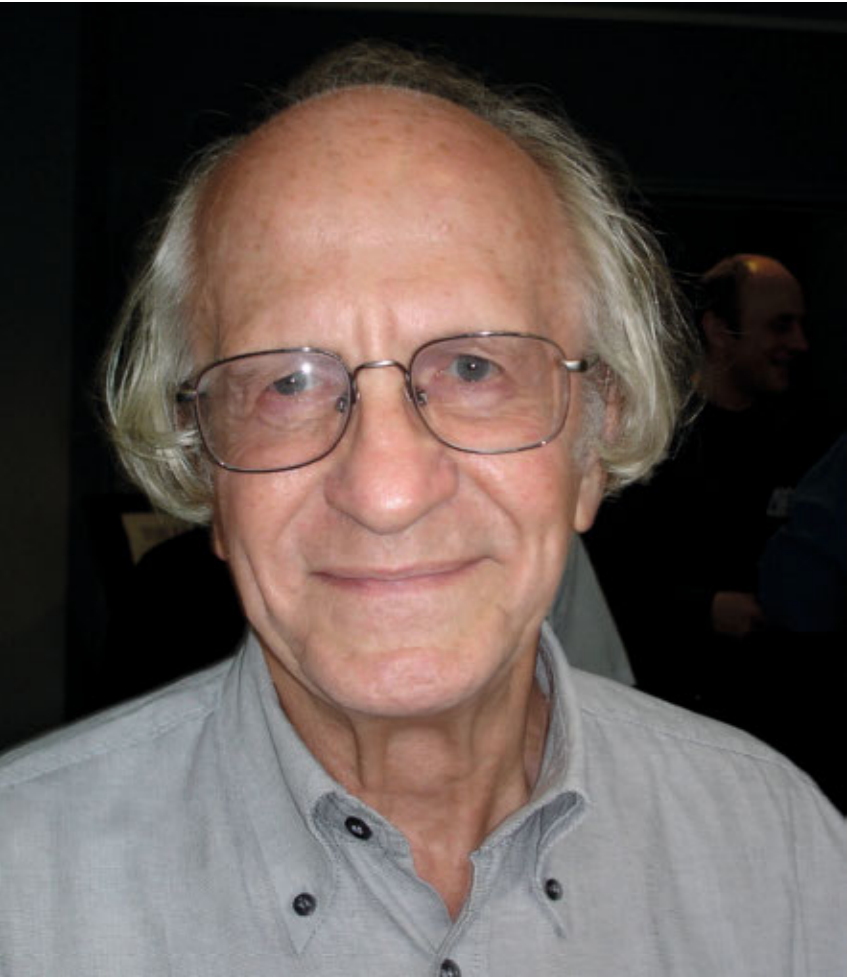
- At the International Association for Lichenology Symposium (IAL 5) in Tartu, Estonia, 2004
- Born: 21 August 1927; Dortmund, Germany
- Died: 14 August 2017 (aged 89); Würzburg, Germany
- Scientific career
- Fields: Botany, lichenology, ecophysiology
- Author abbrev. (botany): O.L.Lange

Otto Ludwig Lange (21 August 1927 – 14 August 2017 in Würzburg) was a German botanist and lichenologist. The focus of his scientific work was on the ecophysiology of wild and cultivated plants as well as lichens. He investigated heat, frost and drought resistance of lichens, bryophytes and vascular plants growing under extreme environmental conditions.

== Life and education ==
Otto Lange was born in Dortmund on 21 August 1927. His family moved to Göttingen, where he went to school. Lange was drafted into the German army at age 16, and became a prisoner of war. This experience affected him greatly as a young man, and later in life he supported anti-war activism. After his return home, he studied biology, chemistry and physics at the Universities of Freiburg and Göttingen. It was from this latter institution that he earned his doctorate degree in 1952, defending a thesis titled "Heat and drought tolerance of lichens in relation to their geographic distribution". His supervisor was Franz Firbas. He also took the state examination for teaching at secondary schools. In 1959 he earned his habilitation in botany. From 1961 to 1963 he was a scientific advisor at the Technische Universität Darmstadt, where he worked as an associate professor in the research group of Otto Stocker. From 1963 to 1967 he held the chair for Forest Botany and Technical Mycology at the University of Göttingen and was responsible for the Forestry Botanical Garden and Arboretum there. From 1967 Lange was Professor of Botany at the University of Würzburg, and also Chair of Plant Ecology, which included the management of the botanical garden.

Lange retired in 1992. He was married to the biologist Rose (née Wilhelm), and they had two daughters. Lange died on 14 August 2017 in Würzburg.

== Career ==
=== Teaching ===
Lange taught general botany, forest botany, forest genetics, plant systematics, general ecology, ecophysiology, vegetation and plant sociology at the universities of Göttingen, Darmstadt and Würzburg. He carried out identification exercises for higher plants, mosses, fungi and lichens, and supervised experimental internships and excursions. He has taught as a visiting scholar at Utah State University, in Australia at Australian National University, and in China at Lanzhou University. Doctoral students Lange has supervised include Ludger Kappen, Burkhard Büdel, Roman Türk and Volkmar Wirth. Lichenologists Thomas Nash and Allan Green have spent considerable time in his laboratory as guest researchers.

=== Research ===
During Lange's 25 years at the University of Wurzburg he alternated long periods in the field with work analysing results back at the lab and writing scientific papers. The aim of his ecological-botanical research was to quantitatively record the behavior and reactions of wild and cultivated plants, as well as of lichens in their outdoor locations in the interplay with their environment. Possibility of existence, distribution and productivity as a result of their morphological properties and their physiological functions were analyzed and causally interpreted. The water balance and photosynthetic carbon gain were a focus of interest. A constant change between measurements and experiments in the field and working under controlled conditions in the laboratory, for example in climatic chambers, was characteristic of such ecophysiological investigations. His research focused on plants and lichens in extreme growth areas from the Antarctic to the tropical rainforest in Panama. His investigations were both basic research and applied aspectd, such as irrigation cultures in desert areas (e.g. in the Negev desert in Israel), work on forest damage caused by air pollutants, or the analysis of "biological soil crusts" as protection against erosion in arid areas. As exact ecophysiological metabolic measurements on plants under field conditions require a specially designed measurement method, Lange set up mobile field laboratories to continuously record photosynthesis and transpiration in plants. In cooperation with specialist companies (in particular, Heinz Walz GmbH), Lange developed special instruments, for example, air-conditioned cuvettes, and "porometers" to determine gas exchange and diffusion resistance of plants and lichens.

=== Publications ===
Lange was editor and co-editor of (Photosynthetica (1967–1995), Oecologia (1970–2007), Flora (1964–), Biochemie und Physiologie der Pflanzen, Trees (1986–1998), Botanica Acta(1987–91)), as well as the book series (Ecological Studies, Man and the Biosphere Programme) and specialist books (e.g. 4 volumes of the Encyclopedia of Plant Physiology: Physiological Plant Ecology, Springer-Verlag 1981–1983).

=== Memberships ===
1976–1981: "Board of Trustees of the Academy for Nature Conservation and Landscape Management", Munich / Laufen 1981–1988: Founder and spokesman of the Würzburg DFG research group "Ecophysiology" 1982–1989: Founding member and advisory board member of the “Bavarian Forest Toxicology Research Group” of the Bavarian State Ministry for Education and Culture 1987–1990: Chairman of the "Arid Ecosystems Research Center" of the Hebrew University Jerusalem (Israel) 1989–1991: Speaker of the DFG Collaborative Research Center 251 at the University of Würzburg "Ecology, Physiology and Biochemistry of Plant Performance under Stress"

== Recognition ==
=== Honours and awards ===
- 1967: The United States Board on Geographical Names named a 2,435 metres (7,989 ft)-high mountain in the Admiralty Range, South Victoria Land, Antarctica, as "Lange Peak" in recognition of the research on lichen ecology at the American Hallet Station, South Victoria Land
- 1972: Member of the German National Academy of Sciences Leopoldina
- 1974: Antarctic Service Medal from the United States Government
- 1978: Member of the Göttingen Academy of Sciences and Humanities
- 1978: Member of the Bavarian Academy of Sciences and Humanities
- 1984: Federal Cross of Merit 1st Class of the Order of Merit of the Federal Republic of Germany
- 1986: Gottfried Wilhelm Leibniz Prize together with Ulrich Heber, for contributions to photosynthesis
- 1988: Balzan Prize for "applied botany including ecology" together with Michael Evenari, Hebrew University Jerusalem,
- 1988: Honorary member of the Regensburg Botanical Society
- 1989: Member of the Academia Europaea, London
- 1990: Adalbert Seifriz Prize for Technology Transfer (Stuttgart), together with master electrician Heinz Walz, Effeltrich
- 1991: Academia Scientiarum et Artium Europaea, Salzburg, Austria
- 1991: Bavarian Maximilian Order for Science and Art
- 1991: Honorary member of the British Lichen Society
- 1992: Honorary member of the Gesellschaft für Mykologie und Lichenologie
- 1992: Acharius Medal of the International Association for Lichenology [6]
- 1993: Honorary member of the Society for Ecology
- 1994: Foreign honorary member of the American Academy of Arts and Sciences
- 1995: Honorary doctorate from the Faculty of Biology, Chemistry and Earth Sciences at the University of Bayreuth
- 1996: Honorary Doctorate from the Technical University of Lisbon
- 2001: Honorary Doctorate from the Technical University of Darmstadt
- 2002: Honorary member of the German Botanical Society
- 2007: Eminent Ecologist Award from the Ecological Society of America
- 2012: Fellow of the Ecological Society of America
- 2014: Medal "Bene Merenti in Gold", in recognition of services to the University of Würzburg
- 2015: Cothenius Medal of the Leopoldina, for his outstanding botanical life's work

Ecological Studies Volume 100 was dedicated to Otto Lange’s retirement, while special volumes in lichenological journals also celebrated his 70th and 80th birthdays.

=== Eponymy ===
The lichen species Peltula langei Büdel & Elix (1997), Hubbsia langei Follmann (1997) and Jackelixia ottolangei S.Y.Kondr., V.Wirth & Kärnefelt (2010), as well as the genus Langeottia S.Y.Kondr., Kärnefelt, Elix, A.Thell & Hur (2014) were named after Otto Ludwig Lange.

== Selected publications ==
Lange has published about 400 scientific articles, roughly half of which dealt with lichens. About 170 of these were published after his retirement in 1992. A complete list of his scientific works can be found in Büdel's publication that celebrates his 80th birthday. Some of his major works include the following:

- Lange, Otto Ludwig (1953). "Hitze- und Trockenresistenz der Flechten in Beziehung zu ihrer Verbreitung" [Lichen resistance to heat and drought in relation to its distribution]. Flora oder Allgemeine Botanische Zeitung. 140 (1): 39–97. doi:10.1016/S0367-1615(17)31917-1.
- Lange, Otto Ludwig; Schulze, Ernst-Detlef; Koch, Werner (1970). "Experimentell-ökologische Untersuchungen an Flechten der Negev-Wüste. II. CO_{2}-Gaswechsel und Wasserhaushalt von Ramalina maciformis (Del.) Bory am natürlichen Standort während der sommerlichen Trockenperiode" [Experimental ecological studies on lichens in the Negev desert: II. CO_{2} gas exchange and water balance of Ramalina maciformis (Del.) Bory in its natural location during the summer dry period]. Flora (in German). 159 (1–2): 38–62. doi:10.1016/S0367-2530(17)31005-8.
- Lange, O. L.; Geiger, I. L.; Schulze, E. -D. (1977). "Ecophysiological investigations on lichens of the Negev desert". Oecologia. 28 (3): 247–259. Bibcode:1977Oecol..28..247L. doi:10.1007/BF00751603. PMID 28309250. S2CID 35147555.
- Schulze, Ernst-Detlef; Lange, Otto Ludwig (1990). "Die Wirkungen von Luftverunreinigungen auf Waldökosysteme" [The effects of air pollution on forest ecosystems]. Chemie in unserer Zeit. 24 (3): 117–130. doi:10.1002/ciuz.19900240306.
- Heber, Ulrich; Bilger, Wolfgang; Bligny, Richard; Lange, Otto Ludwig (2000). "Phototolerance of lichens, mosses and higher plants in an alpine environment: analysis of photoreactions". Planta. 211 (6): 770–780. Bibcode:2000Plant.211..770H. doi:10.1007/s004250000356. PMID 11144261. S2CID 20384789.
- Lange, Otto L. (2003). "Photosynthetic productivity of the epilithic lichen Lecanora muralis: long-term field monitoring of CO_{2} exchange and its physiological interpretation". Flora - Morphology, Distribution, Functional Ecology of Plants. 198 (4): 277–292. doi:10.1078/0367-2530-00100.
