= Taedigera =

Scientific classification
- Kingdom: Fungi
- Division: Ascomycota
- Class: Lecanoromycetes
- Order: Teloschistales
- Family: Teloschistaceae
- Genus: Taedigera; Søchting & Arup (2024)

Type species
- Taedigera epibrya (Kantvilas & Søchting) Søchting & Arup (2024)

Species
- T. epibrya T. flammea T. gallowayi T. pyramus T. ramulicola T. subpyracea

Genus of lichens

Taedigera is a genus of lichen-forming fungi in the family Teloschistaceae. It comprises 6 species. The genus was established in 2024 to accommodate a group of twig-dwelling lichens previously misplaced in the genus Marchantiana, from which they were separated based on molecular evidence and chemical differences. Taedigera species are characterised by their small orange to orange-red fruiting bodies and distinctive chemistry dominated by the anthraquinone pigments parietin or emodin. These inconspicuous lichens typically grow on the slender twigs of shrubs and trees in cool, open habitats such as riverbanks, coastal scrub, and subalpine shrublands. Taedigera is a cool-temperate, Southern Hemisphere lineage: species occur in southern Patagonia (with records from the Falkland Islands), New Zealand, and Australia.

== Taxonomy ==
Taedigera was erected in 2024 by Ulrik Søchting and Ulf Arup during their revision of the twig-dwelling teloschistoid lichens formerly placed in an expanded Marchantiana. Multi-gene molecular analyses showed that "Marchantiana sensu lato" actually comprises two well-supported clades separated by Yoshimuria; the Australian clade retains the name Marchantiana (with M. occidentalis as type species), whereas the southern South American–New Zealand clade was segregated as Taedigera. The authors also note that earlier concepts of Marchantiana were muddled by misidentified DNA sequences, which this study corrects with new sequencing of type material.

The genus was published with Taedigera epibrya as type (new combination from Caloplaca epibrya). In the same work, the authors recognised six species in Taedigera: the new combinations T. pyramus and T. ramulicola (from Marchantiana) and T. subpyracea (from Lecanora), plus two species described as new to science, T. flammea and T. gallowayi. The formal diagnosis characterises Taedigera as a group of small, twig-dwelling crusts with tiny zeorine apothecia (with a thalline rim) and polardiblastic spores. Chemically, the genus is defined by anthraquinone chemosyndromes dominated by parietin (Type A) or by emodin (Types E and E3), the latter uncommon in Teloschistaceae and used here (together with the molecular evidence) to separate Taedigera from Marchantiana, which also features chlorinated anthraquinones such as (neo)chloroemodin.

The name Taedigera ('torchbearer') refers to the flame-coloured discs typical of the genus. By contrast, the allied Yoshimuria (East Asia) has well-developed rock-dwelling thalli and larger apothecia.

== Description ==
Taedigera comprises small, twig-dwelling crusts with a very thin, often poorly developed thallus. The reproductive discs (apothecia) are minute, typically about 0.3–0.5 mm across, and usually orange to orange-red from anthraquinone pigments. Their form ranges from zeorine (with a thin thallus-derived rim) to biatorine (rim only from the apothecial tissue). Spores are ellipsoid and two-celled (polardiblastic), separated by a distinct median septum.

Across species, the apothecial rim is typically well developed and persistent (often about 50–60 μm thick), while any thalline margin is soon suppressed. Discs are commonly a deeper orange than the rim and may bear a coarse sandy frosting (epipsamma). In section, the hypothecium is hyaline; the proper exciple is fan-shaped; paraphyses are slender and mostly simple; and ascospores are c. 11–13 × 6–8 μm with septa c. 5–6 μm.

Chemically, Taedigera is defined by anthraquinone profiles centred on either parietin (chemosyndrome A) or emodin. Two emodin-based patterns occur: E (emodin only) and E3 (emodin plus substantial amounts of its oxidation products). These emodin-dominated chemosyndromes are characteristic of Taedigera.

== Habitat and distribution ==
Taedigera is a cool-temperate Southern Hemisphere genus that grows chiefly on slender living or dead twigs of shrubs and trees, with moss substratesonly occasional. Its range spans southern Patagonia, New Zealand (including the Chatham Islands), and Tasmania. Field collections show it in varied but generally cool, open settings such as riverbanks, coastal scrub, and subalpine shrublands. Species share similar twig-epiphytic habits: T. flammea occurs on fine branches of gorse and poplar and on twigs of willow and currant and appears fairly common in New Zealand; T. gallowayi has been gathered from dead twigs at subalpine sites in the southern South Island; T. pyramus is common on twigs in Patagonia, with additional records from the Falkland Islands and an outlying Tasmanian specimen on dead Eucalyptus; T. ramulicola is known from three localities in southern Chile on thin dead twigs; and T. subpyracea grows on smooth bark, especially twigs, and is widespread in New Zealand, though some older records likely folded in the newly recognised segregates. The type species, T. epibrya, was described from open heath in Tasmania, amongst mosses on boulders at 1,000 m. Overall, the genus appears restricted to cooler regions, in contrast to its close relative Marchantiana, which is centred in warmer mainland Australia.

== Species ==
- Taedigera epibrya (Kantvilas & Søchting) Søchting & Arup (2024)
- Taedigera flammea Søchting (2024)
- Taedigera gallowayi Søchting (2024)
- Taedigera pyramus (Søchting & Arup) Søchting & Arup (2024)
- Taedigera ramulicola (Søchting & Arup) Søchting & Arup (2024)
- Taedigera subpyracea (Nyl.) Søchting & Arup (2024)
