= Marchantiana occidentalis =

Scientific classification
- Kingdom: Fungi
- Division: Ascomycota
- Class: Lecanoromycetes
- Order: Teloschistales
- Family: Teloschistaceae
- Genus: Marchantiana
- Species: M. occidentalis

Binomial name
- Marchantiana occidentalis (Elix, S.Y.Kondr. & Kärnefelt) S.Y.Kondr., Kärnefelt, Elix, A.Thell, Jung Kim, A.S.Kondr. & Hur (2014)
- Holotype site: Bullfinch-Evanston road, Western Australia

Synonyms
- Caloplaca occidentalis Elix, S.Y.Kondr. & Kärnefelt (2009)

Species of lichen

Marchantiana occidentalis is a species of corticolous and saxicolous (bark- and rock-dwelling), crustose lichen in the family Teloschistaceae. It is found in Western Australia, usually as an inhabitant of dry twigs, bark, or wood of various plant species, but occasionally on granite rock outcrops. It forms a well-developed thallus, shiny and composed of tiny dark greenish to brown areoles, with sizes typically ranging from 5–15 mm, though larger aggregations are possible. It features numerous rounded apothecia (fruiting bodies) scattered across its surface, varying in form and colour, with a distinct margin and disc.

== Taxonomy ==
The lichen was first formally described as a new species in 2009 by the lichenologists John Alan Elix, Sergey Kondratyuk, and Ingvar Kärnefelt. It was originally classified by the authors in the genus Caloplaca. The type specimen was collected by Elix along Bullfinch-Evanston road about 25 km (16 miles) north of Bullfinch (Western Australia), at an elevation of 345 m (1,132 ft). There, it was found growing on a dead Acacia plant in Eucalyptus woodland. The species epithet alludes to its Western (Latin, occidentalis) Australian distribution. The taxon was transferred to the newly circumscribed genus Marchantiana in 2014, in which it is the type species.

== Description ==
Marchantiana occidentalis typically presents as a well-developed crust-like thallus, usually measuring between 5 and 15 mm in width, though it can form larger aggregations. The thallus is relatively thin to thick and has a superficial shiny appearance, mainly due to its composition of tiny areoles. These areoles range in colour from dark greenish to dark brown and can be found along cracks in the bark or immersed within it. Each areole is small, measuring about 0.2–0.3 mm, and has a somewhat shiny surface.

The species has numerous rounded apothecia (fruiting bodies), which are typically scattered across the thallus surface, measuring between 0.3 and 0.7 mm in diameter. These apothecia are either biatorine in form or, less commonly, zeorine. The thalline margin, visible at the base of the apothecia, is brownish or blackish-brown and shiny. The disc of the apothecia is typically dull orange or brownish-orange. Initially immersed, it becomes slightly raised and can be flat to weakly concave. The true exciple is coloured similarly to the disc and the form of its tissue structure varies from pseudoprosoplectenchymatous with a brownish-black outer layer to paraplectenchymatous with a well-developed matrix. The hymenium (the fertile spore-bearing tissue) measures 60–70 μm in height, while the subhymenium is thicker, ranging from 30 to 100 μm. The paraphyses in Marchantiana occidentalis are not swollen, measure about 2–3 μm in diameter, and are richly branched and twisted above the asci. Each ascus contains eight spores. The ascospores are hyaline (translucent) and have significant variability in shape, from short and broadly ellipsoid to narrow and elongate-ellipsoid, sometimes curved, with narrow septa (internal partitions) and a wide channel. Their spore size ranges from 11 to 13 μm in length and 4.5–6 μm in width, with septa measuring 3–5 μm.

Chemically, the cortex, thalline and true exciple, and epihymenium react with a purple-violet colour change to the K spot test. Marchantiana occidentalis contains parietin as a major secondary metabolite (lichen product), along with minor amounts of parietinic acid, emodin, and traces of ascomatic acid, methyl ascomatate, and 7-O-methylascomatic acid.

== Similar species ==
Marchantiana occidentalis is distinguishable from similar species through a few key characteristics. It shares a resemblance with Caloplaca magnetensis due to its dark greenish-brown thallus. However, M. occidentalis sets itself apart with its centrally aggregated orange to orange-brown apothecia and the unique presence of lichen products such as ascomatic acid, methyl ascomatate, and 7-O-methylascomatic acid. Additionally, while C. magnetensis has a more developed thallus and lecanorine apothecia, its ascospores have narrower septa, measuring 1–2 μm in width compared to the 3–5 μm wide septa of M. occidentalis.

Another species, the northern Eurasian Huneckia pollinii, shares morphological similarities with M. occidentalis. However, M. occidentalis is identified by its more developed, continuous thallus, and its distinctly shorter and narrower ascospores, which measure 11–13 by 4.5–6 μm compared to 15–18 by 8–10 μm in H. pollinii. Additionally, there are chemical differences between the two species.

Another possible lookalike, Dijigiella kaernefeltiana has some morphological characteristics that distinguish it from Marchantiana occidentalis. It is characterised by a greyish-greenish or greyish-whitish thallus, contrasting with the brown to dark brown, greenish areoles of M. occidentalis which are more deeply embedded in bark. Additionally, D. kaernefeltiana features zeorine or lecanorine apothecia with a distinct bright orange disc and a true exciple, differing from the (usually) biatorine type found in M. occidentalis. The exciple of D. kaernefeltiana is scleroplectenchymatous or presents a textura intricata pattern, in contrast to the pseudoprosoplectenchymatous and paraplectenchymatous structure seen in the lateral and basal portions, respectively, of M. occidentalis. Chemically, D. kaernefeltiana is distinguished by the absence of ascomatic acid, ascomatatic and 7-O-methylascomatatic acid. Moreover, the ascospores of D. kaernefeltiana are somewhat shorter, measuring 8–13 by 4.5–6 μm.

== Habitat and distribution ==
Marchantiana occidentalis predominantly inhabits Eucalyptus woodlands that have a shrubby understory. It is typically found growing on dry twigs, bark, or wood of various plant species, including Acacia, Casuarina, Melaleuca, and Callitris. In its natural habitat, M. occidentalis often coexists with other lichen species such as Villophora erythrosticta, and various species from the genera Rinodina, Lecidella, and Bacidia. Although a less common substrate, M. occidentalis can also occasionally be found growing on granite outcrops. As for its geographical distribution, Marchantiana occidentalis occurs in Western Australia.
