= Lecidella mandshurica =

Scientific classification
- Domain: Eukaryota
- Kingdom: Fungi
- Division: Ascomycota
- Class: Lecanoromycetes
- Order: Lecanorales
- Family: Lecanoraceae
- Genus: Lecidella
- Species: L. mandshurica

Binomial name
- Lecidella mandshurica S.Y.Kondr., Lőkös & Hur (2015)

Species of lichen

Lecidella mandshurica is a species of corticolous (bark-dwelling), crustose lichen in the family Lecanoraceae. It is found in the Russian Far East, South Korea, and China.

== Taxonomy ==
Lecidella mandshurica was formally described as a new species in 2015 by lichenologists Sergey Kondratyuk, Laszlo Lőkös, and Jae-Seoun Hur. The type specimen was collected along a road near Razdolnoe village (Nadezhdino district, Primorsky Krai). There, in an oak forest, the lichen was found growing on oak bark, along with a foliose lichen of genus Punctelia. The species epithet mandshurica refers to Manchuria, a historical and geographic region in Northeast Asia where the authors suggest that the lichen is common.

Molecular phylogenetic published in 2019 shows that Lecidella mandshurica forms a monophyletic clade with Lecidella elaeochroma and L. euphorea.

== Description ==
The crustose thallus of Lecidella mandshurica is grey, to whitish grey, to greenish gray. It is covered with tiny (0.1–0.2 mm in diameter) wart-like bumps called verrucae. Sometimes when the thallus is in contact with another crustose lichen, a hypothallus is visible as a thin black line. The apothecia are rounded to irregular in outline, closely pressed to the thallus, measuring 0.4–1.6 mm in diameter. The disc in the apothecium (containing the hymenium), black to dark violet-black in colour, is initially flat before becoming somewhat convex. A black to shiny golden margin encircles the disc. The ascospores, which number eight per ascus, are ellipsoid to ovoid in shape, typically measuring 9–12 by 5–7 μm.

The European and North American species Lecidella elaeochroma is quite similar in morphology to Lecidella mandshurica, but can be distinguished by subtle differences in microscopic structures and chemical spot reactions.

== Habitat and distribution ==
Lecidella mandshurica inhabits the bark of deciduous trees. The lichen has been documented from several locations in the southernmost parts of Primorsky Krai in the Russian Far East, including the Khasan and Nadezhdino districts, as well as from Sakhalin and Khabarovsk regions. It has also been reported from Jeongseon County in South Korea. The authors suggested that its range may be expanded as additional records Eastern Asian records of Lecidella euphorea are studied. This is what happened when molecular phylogenetic analysis was used to show that specimens collected from China as Lecidella aff. elaeochroma, deposited as DNA sequences on GenBank, were genetically identical with Lecidella mandshurica, thus expanding the distribution to include China.
