= Marchantiana =

Scientific classification
- Kingdom: Fungi
- Division: Ascomycota
- Class: Lecanoromycetes
- Order: Teloschistales
- Family: Teloschistaceae
- Genus: Marchantiana; S.Y.Kondr., Kärnefelt, Elix, A.Thell & Hur (2014)

Type species
- Marchantiana occidentalis (Elix, S.Y.Kondr. & Kärnefelt) S.Y.Kondr., Kärnefelt, A.Thell, Elix, J.Kim, A.S.Kondr. & Hur (2014)

Species
- M. beaugleholei M. haematommona M. magnetensis M. occidentalis M. queenslandica M. tasmanica M. tephromelae

Genus of lichen-forming fungi

Marchantiana is a genus of lichen-forming fungi in the family Teloschistaceae. It contains seven species of corticolous (bark-dwelling), crustose lichens, recorded mainly from Australia. Originally proposed in 2014, the genus underwent significant revision in 2024 when molecular studies showed it comprised two distinct evolutionary lineages. This led to the creation of the new genus Taedigera to accommodate the cool-temperate species from New Zealand and Patagonia, while Marchantiana was retained for the warmer-climate Australian species. Later DNA-based work has treated Streimanniella as a separate genus closely related to Marchantiana, rather than as a synonym.

== Taxonomy ==
The lichenologists Sergey Kondratyuk, Ingvar Kärnefelt, John Alan Elix, Arne Thell, and Jae-Seoun Hur circumscribed the genus Marchantiana in 2014, as part of a taxonomic revision of the family Teloschistaceae. They designated Marchantiana occidentalis as its type species. Initially, the genus comprised six species, all native to the Southern Hemisphere, with all but one species from Australia. The genus was named in honour of the Australian botanist Neville Graeme Marchant, to acknowledge his extensive contributions to the flora of Western Australia.

In 2023, molecular analysis using three genes suggested a close relationship between Marchantiana and Yoshimuria, and identified several new species from Patagonia. A comprehensive revision in 2024 built upon these findings, revealing that what was previously considered Marchantiana actually represents two distinct genera. While Marchantiana in the strict sense (sensu stricto) was retained for the type species M. occidentalis and related species primarily from Australia, a new genus Taedigera was established for species from southern Patagonia and New Zealand. This revision also confirmed that the genus Yoshimuria from East Asia represents a sister group to both genera. A 2024 revision treated Streimanniella as a synonym of Marchantiana. However, a broader three-gene phylogenetic study published in 2025 recovered Streimanniella and Marchantiana as two well-supported sister lineages and resurrected Streimanniella as a separate genus. In those analyses, Streimanniella michelagoensis (the type species of Streimanniella) was placed in Streimanniella and recovered as sister to Marchantiana. In the same 2025 study, Kondratyuk and co-authors made two additional combinations in Marchantiana (M. beaugleholei and M. tephromelae). They also recombined the European species previously called Marchantiana asserigena as Streimanniella asserigena, reflecting their treatment of Streimanniella as distinct from Marchantiana.

Several species previously placed in Marchantiana were also found to belong in other genera – for example, M. maulensis was transferred to the genus Villophora, while M. burneyensis, M. kalbiorum and M. seppeltii were shown to belong in the subfamily Teloschistoideae.

The current circumscription recognises seven species in Marchantiana. The sister genus Taedigera contains six species found primarily in New Zealand and southern Patagonia. This geographic pattern, along with differences in secondary chemistry, supports the separation of these genera despite their morphological similarities.

== Description ==
Both Marchantiana and Taedigera have a crust-like thallus that can range in appearance from a continuous to a patchy texture. Their colour varies, encompassing pale grey, dark brownish-grey, dark greenish-grey, and even vibrant hues of yellow or orange. The cortical layer is often thin and arranged in a specific cellular pattern known as paraplectenchymatous. The apothecia can fall into three types: biatorine, zeorine, or lecanorine. The true exciple of these structures are made of pseudoprosoplectenchymatous tissue. Each reproductive sac, or ascus, contains eight spores that are divided into 2, 3, or 4 compartments (locules) by partitions called septa. Its conidia are rod-shaped to slightly elongate. The two genera are distinguished primarily by their secondary chemistry. Marchantiana species are characterised by diverse secondary metabolites, including chlorinated compounds like neochloroemodin and 5-chloroemodin, as well as depsidones like vicanicin, isofulgidin and caloploicin. In contrast, Taedigera species show simpler chemical profiles dominated by either parietin or emodin and its derivatives.

Standard chemical spot tests indicate reactions vary between species, with some showing K+ (purple) reactions in both thallus and apothecia, while others show K− reactions in the thallus but K+ (purple) in the apothecia. Some Taedigera species also show distinctive C+ (red) reactions in their apothecia.

The genera also show distinct geographic patterns, with Marchantiana species primarily occurring in warmer regions of mainland Australia, while Taedigera species are found in cooler regions of New Zealand and southern Patagonia. Both genera are primarily corticolous, growing on thin twigs and branches, though some species can occasionally be found on other substrates.

== Species ==
Marchantiana includes seven species of corticolous (bark-dwelling) lichens, primarily found in Australia:

- M. beaugleholei (S.Y.Kondr. & Kärnefelt) S.Y.Kondr., Kärnefelt, L.Lőkös & A.Thell (2025)
- M. haematommona (Elix & S.Y.Kondr.) Søchting & Arup (2024)
- M. magnetensis (S.Y.Kondr., Elix, Kärnefelt & Kalb) Søchting & Arup (2024)
- M. occidentalis (Elix, S.Y.Kondr. & Kärnefelt) S.Y.Kondr., Kärnefelt, Elix, A.Thell, Jung Kim, A.S.Kondr. & Hur (2014)
- M. queenslandica (Kalb, S.Y.Kondr., Elix & Kärnefelt) Arup & Søchting (2023)
- M. tasmanica Søchting (2024)
- M. tephromelae (Kantvilas, Suija & Motiej.) S.Y.Kondr., Kärnefelt, L.Lőkös & A.Thell (2025)

=== Former species ===
Several species previously placed in Marchantiana have been transferred to other genera:

- Marchantiana asserigena (Stizenb. ex J.Lahm) Søchting & Arup (2018) was recombined as Streimanniella asserigena in 2025.
- Marchantiana maulensis S.Y.Kondr. et J.-S. Hur (2014) was transferred to the genus Villophora as Villophora maulensis.
- Marchantiana michelagoensis was treated as Streimanniella michelagoensis in 2025, when Streimanniella was resurrected as a separate genus.
- Marchantiana burneyensis, M. kalbiorum, and M. seppeltii were shown to belong in the subfamily Teloschistoideae and are no longer considered part of Marchantiana.
- Six species (M. epibrya, M. pyramus, M. ramulicola, M. subpyracea, and two newly described species) were transferred to the new genus Taedigera.
