= Lecanora hafelliana =

Scientific classification
- Kingdom: Fungi
- Division: Ascomycota
- Class: Lecanoromycetes
- Order: Lecanorales
- Family: Lecanoraceae
- Genus: Lecanora
- Species: L. hafelliana

Binomial name
- Lecanora hafelliana L.Lü, Y.Joshi & Hur (2011)

Species of lichen

Lecanora hafelliana is a species of corticolous (bark-dwelling), crustose lichen in the family Lecanoraceae. It was described in 2011 from specimens collected in South Korea, where it commonly grows on the bark of various broadleaved trees including maples, birches, and oaks. The lichen forms a well-developed greyish crust with abundant small, yellowish-brown to reddish-brown circular fruiting bodies that have thick, pale rims. It is found in the temperate mountains of Northeast Asia, ranging from South Korea into northeastern China at elevations between 680–1,660 metres.

== Description ==
Lecanora hafelliana forms a well-developed crust on tree bark. The thallus—its main body—is tightly attached to the substrate (a crustose growth form) and spreads in a continuous film that ranges from dull whitish to ash-grey. Its surface is uneven, even wart-like (verruculose), yet the outer edge remains sharply defined. There is no dark border (prothallus) around the colony. Simple spot tests on the thallus give K+ (yellow), KC+ (yellow) and P+ (pale-yellow) reactions, indicating the presence of atranorin, usnic acid, zeorin, the stictic acid complex and the rarer hafellic acid.

The species produces abundant, stalkless fruiting bodies (apothecia) measuring 0.5–1.6 mm across. Each apothecium has a rim of thallus tissue—a lecanorine margin—that is usually paler than the surrounding crust, thick, and unbroken. The disc itself is yellowish-brown to dark reddish-brown and may carry a thin frost-like coating (white pruina); it is generally flat but can be slightly bowl-shaped in older material. Microscopic sections reveal a marginal layer (amphithecium) packed with tiny potassium hydroxide (K)-soluble crystals and capped by a clear, gelatinous outer cortex up to 100 μm thick. Above the spore layer lies a dark brown epihymenium containing coarse, K-soluble granules; beneath it, the colourless hymenium is about 45 μm tall and free of oil droplets. The supporting subhymenium and hypothecium are likewise colourless.

Inside each club-shaped ascus are eight colourless, single-celled ascospores. These spores are ellipsoid to narrowly ellipsoid, typically 10.5–15 μm long by 6.2–7.8 μm wide, with very thin walls. Sterile filaments (paraphyses) are simple, neither swollen nor pigmented at their tips, and no flask-shaped pycnidia—structures that would produce asexual spores—have been seen in the species. Collectively, these features—especially the thick pale rim, the extensive crystal-rich amphithecium, and the distinctive suite of secondary metabolites—separate Lecanora hafelliana from others in genus Lecanora.

== Habitat and distribution ==
Lecanora hafelliana is known from temperate North-east Asia. In South Korea it is regarded as frequent, colonising the bark of a wide range of broad-leaved hosts—including maples (Acer), birches (Betula), dogwoods (Cornus) and oaks (Quercus)—across the lower montane to sub-alpine belt at roughly 730–1,660 m elevation. Its range extends into north-eastern China, where it has been recorded on Korean pine (Pinus koraiensis) at about 680 m. In Korea, it is found in a community of crustose lichens including Arthonia apatetica, Lecanora lojkahugoi, Lecidella mandshurica, and Rinodina xanthophaea.

== See also ==
- List of Lecanora species
