= Lecidella fuliginea =

Scientific classification
- Kingdom: Fungi
- Division: Ascomycota
- Class: Lecanoromycetes
- Order: Lecanorales
- Family: Lecanoraceae
- Genus: Lecidella
- Species: L. fuliginea

Binomial name
- Lecidella fuliginea Aptroot & L.A.Santos (2022)

Species of lichen-forming fungus

Lecidella fuliginea is a bark-dwelling crustose lichen in the family Lecanoraceae. It forms pale greenish patches on tree bark in montane rainforest in southeastern Brazil. The species is distinguished by small, round to slightly lobed fruiting bodies (apothecia) with purplish-brown to black discs, violet pigmentation in the tissues, and a distinctive xanthone (a lichen product). It was formally described in 2022 from material collected in the Santuário do Caraça region of Minas Gerais state at 1,200 to 1,400 m (3,900 to 4,600 ft) elevation. It remains known only from Brazil.

== Taxonomy ==
Lecidella fuliginea was described in 2022 by André Aptroot and Lidiane Alves dos Santos from material collected on tree bark in rainforest at Santuário do Caraça, Minas Gerais, Brazil, at 1,200–1,400 m (3,900–4,600 ft) elevation. The holotype (A. Aptroot 52200 & L.A. dos Santos), the reference specimen for the name, is held in the herbarium of the Instituto de Botânica (ISE). An isotype (a duplicate specimen) in kept the herbarium of the Federal University of Mato Grosso do Sul (CGMS). Within Lecidella, the species is externally similar to Lecidella elaeochroma but more similar internally to Lecidella violaceofuliginea. It shares violet pigmentation and a densely inspersed hymenium (the spore-bearing layer) with L. violaceofuliginea. Comparison with L. violaceofuliginea from the same locality (topotype material, collected at the type locality) indicated that L. fuliginea is closely related but differs in its smaller thallus and apothecia, and in having a xanthone in the thallus. These differences support treating it as a distinct species.

== Description ==
The thallus of Lecidella fuliginea is crustose and cracked into minute areoles (small angular surface patches). It forms a slightly glossy, pale greenish crust up to about 3 cm (1.2 in) across and roughly 0.1 mm thick, bordered by an thin black prothallus line about 0.2 mm wide. It has a cortex (outer layer), and the photobiont (algal partner) is trebouxioid. The fruiting bodies (ascomata) are solitary, sessile (sitting directly on the surface), and not constricted at the base. They are round to somewhat lobed, 0.2–1.4 mm in diameter and about 0.2 mm high. The disc (central surface) is flat and purplish brown to black, and it is not pruinose (not powdery). The glossy margin is the same colour as the disc, slightly raised, and about 0.05 mm wide. In microscopic section, the excipulum is brown, the epihymenium grey, and the hypothecium red-brown. The hamathecium (tissue between the asci) is densely inspersed with hyaline (colourless) oil droplets, and it turns blue with iodine (IKI+). Ascospores are produced eight per ascus. The spores are hyaline, simple, long-ellipsoid, and measure 13–16 × 7–8.5 μm. They lack a surrounding gelatinous sheath. Pycnidia have not been observed. In standard spot tests, the thallus is UV+ (pink) but negative in the C, K, KC, and P tests. Thin-layer chromatography detects a xanthone as the main lichen substance, interpreted as 4,5-dichloronorlichexanthone.

== Habitat and distribution ==
Lecidella fuliginea is known from its type locality (the place where the type specimen was collected) in the Santuário do Caraça area of Minas Gerais in southeastern Brazil. There it grows on tree bark in primary rain forest at elevations between about 1,200 and 1,400 m (3,900 and 4,600 ft). As the time of its original publication, it had not been reported from outside Brazil. As of 2025, no additional records had been reported.
