= Lecidella greenii =

Scientific classification
- Kingdom: Fungi
- Division: Ascomycota
- Class: Lecanoromycetes
- Order: Lecanorales
- Family: Lecanoraceae
- Genus: Lecidella
- Species: L. greenii

Binomial name
- Lecidella greenii U.Ruprecht & Türk (2011)

Species of lichen

Lecidella greenii is a species of lichen-forming fungus in the family Lecanoraceae. The lichen forms whitish to pale grey crusts up to 5 cm across on granite rocks, with small black fruiting bodies that occur in dense clusters. It grows both on exposed rock surfaces and within natural rock cracks in ice-free areas of Victoria Land, particularly in coastal sites influenced by fog.

== Taxonomy ==
Lecidella greenii was formally described in 2008 by Ursula Ruprecht and Roman Türk from material they collected at Granite Harbour in the Transantarctic Mountains of Victoria Land.The species is one of only two members of Lecidella known from continental Antarctica (as of 2011), and it conforms to the genus through its small black, lecideoid apothecia and the presence of Lecidella-type asci, characters that distinguish the group from superficially similar crustose genera such as Lecanora and Lecidea.

The epithet honours the New Zealand botanist T.G. Allan Green. Within Lecidella, the combination of a strictly rock-dwelling lifestyle, broadly ellipsoid, non-septate spores averaging 10–11 micrometres (μm) long, and the presence—in one of two chemotypes—of the stictic acid complex sets L. greenii apart from other members of its genus.

A 2012 molecular study of Antarctic Lecanoraceae placed Lecidella greenii in a distinct, well-supported lineage that is sister to the combined L. patavina/L. stigmatea group and to the bipolar species L. siplei. The same analysis, which sampled 90 specimens along a Ross Sea transect, recovered seven major clades in the family and suggested that roughly 75% of the region's lecideoid lichens are endemic to continental Antarctica—evidence that reinforces L. greenii's status as a locally confined species.

== Description ==
The thallus forms a well-developed, crustose film that appears whitish to pale grey-beige and may occupy patches up to five centimetres across. Its surface is cracked into small polygonal areoles and, in places, becomes minutely granular; individual areoles or granules rise no more than a millimetre above the rock. The lichen grows both within natural fissures of the granite (chasmolithic) and on the exposed surface (epilithic). Black pycnidia are rare and inconspicuous; they provide an asexual means of reproduction. The photobiont is a green alga assigned to Trebouxia, whose cells are dispersed throughout the upper portion of the thallus.

Apothecia (fruiting bodies) occur in dense clusters and enlarge with age from flat to modestly convex discs up to about 1.2 mm in diameter. When young they show a thin, pale rim that soon becomes lost beneath the expanding black, matt disc. Microscopic examination reveals an olive-green epihymenium (≤ 10 μm thick) overlying a colourless hymenium 80–90 μm tall that becomes lightly brownish at maturity and is suffused with minute oil droplets. Paraphyses are simple, flexuous threads 1–2 μm wide whose tips swell slightly and accumulate the same dark pigment that colours the upper disc. The hymenial gel does not stain with iodine (I–), and spot tests give variable K reactions (either negative or a brief yellow flash) but remain negative for C. Each Lecidella-type ascus contains eight hyaline spores that lack internal walls (septa); they are broadly ellipsoid, typically 10–11 μm long by 6–7 μm wide, yielding a length-to-width ratio of about 1.5. Two chemotypes have been detected: one apparently lacks secondary metabolites, while the other produces the stictic acid chemosyndrome.

== Habitat and distribution ==
Lecidella greenii is known only from continental Antarctica. Collections come from several ice-free areas in Victoria Land, including Granite Harbour, Mount Suess and the Taylor Valley, as well as Granite Harbour's Botany Bay sector. The species appears on sun-exposed granite outcrops and adjacent sandy soil; most collections are from sun-exposed boulders in the coastal Ross Sea sector. The lichen's thalli grow directly on weathered rock surfaces as well as within fine cracks, exploiting both exposed and slightly protected microhabitats. Along a north–south transect of the Ross Sea, L. greenii is abundant in the comparatively milder, fog-influenced coastal sites (Cape Hallett, Botany Bay) but scarce in the inner dry-valley deserts.
