= Niu Quaia =

- Choir
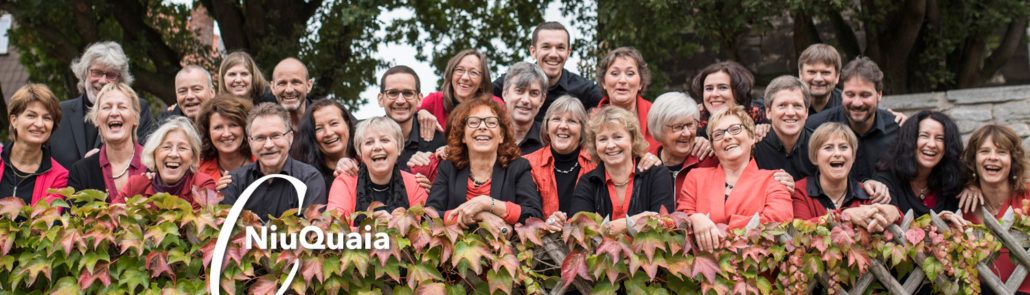
- The choir "Niu Quaia".
- Origin: Edermunde-Grifte, Germany
- Founded: 18 June 1997
- Genre: rock, pop, soul and jazz choral music
- Members: 35 SSAATBB
- Choirmaster: Thorsten Seydler
- Choir admission: free
- Affiliation: Choral Society of Grifte

Niu Quaia is a mixed choir from Edermunde-Grifte, North Hesse, Germany, who sing rock, pop, soul and jazz. They are conducted by Thorsten Seydler, a professional musician based in Trendelburg, North Hesse, Germany.

The name Niu Quaia is pronounced in German as "new choir". The choir is one of two that belong to the 125-year-old 'Gesangvereins 1889 Grifte' (Choral Society of Grifte); the other one is the Young Voices.

Niu Quaia was founded on 18 June 1997. They celebrated their fifteenth anniversary in 2012 and their twentieth anniversary in 2017.

The choir consists of ca. 30–35 people who rehearse every Tuesday from 8–10 pm in the village town hall in Edermünde-Grifte. Every year there is one weekend workshop and every two years they go on tour. In 2011 the choir gave a concert in Berlin; in 2013 the choir went to Bedfordshire, England for 4 days, and, in 2015, the choir went to Vienna, Austria for 4 days.

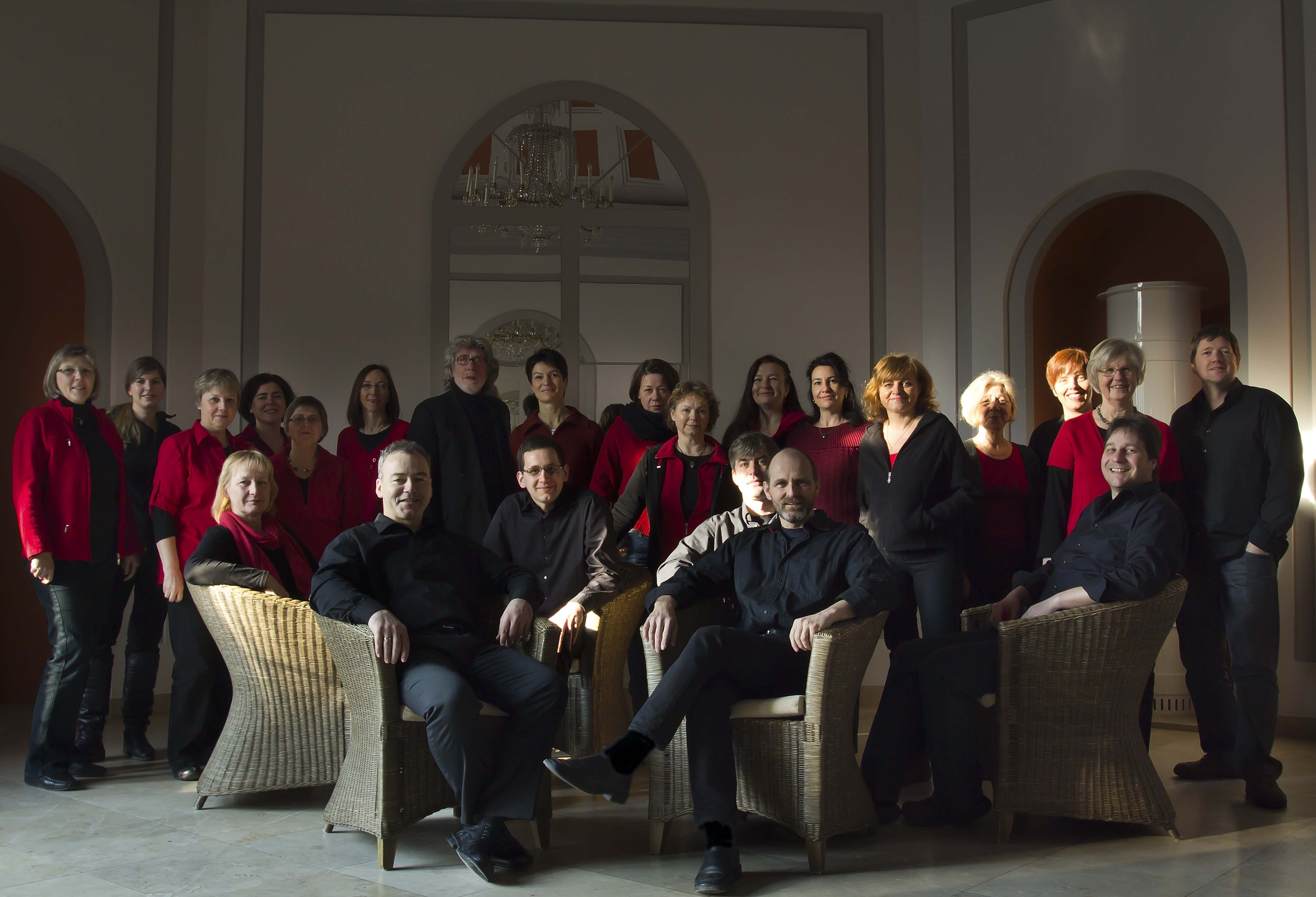
Niu Quaia during their annual workshop in February 2012.

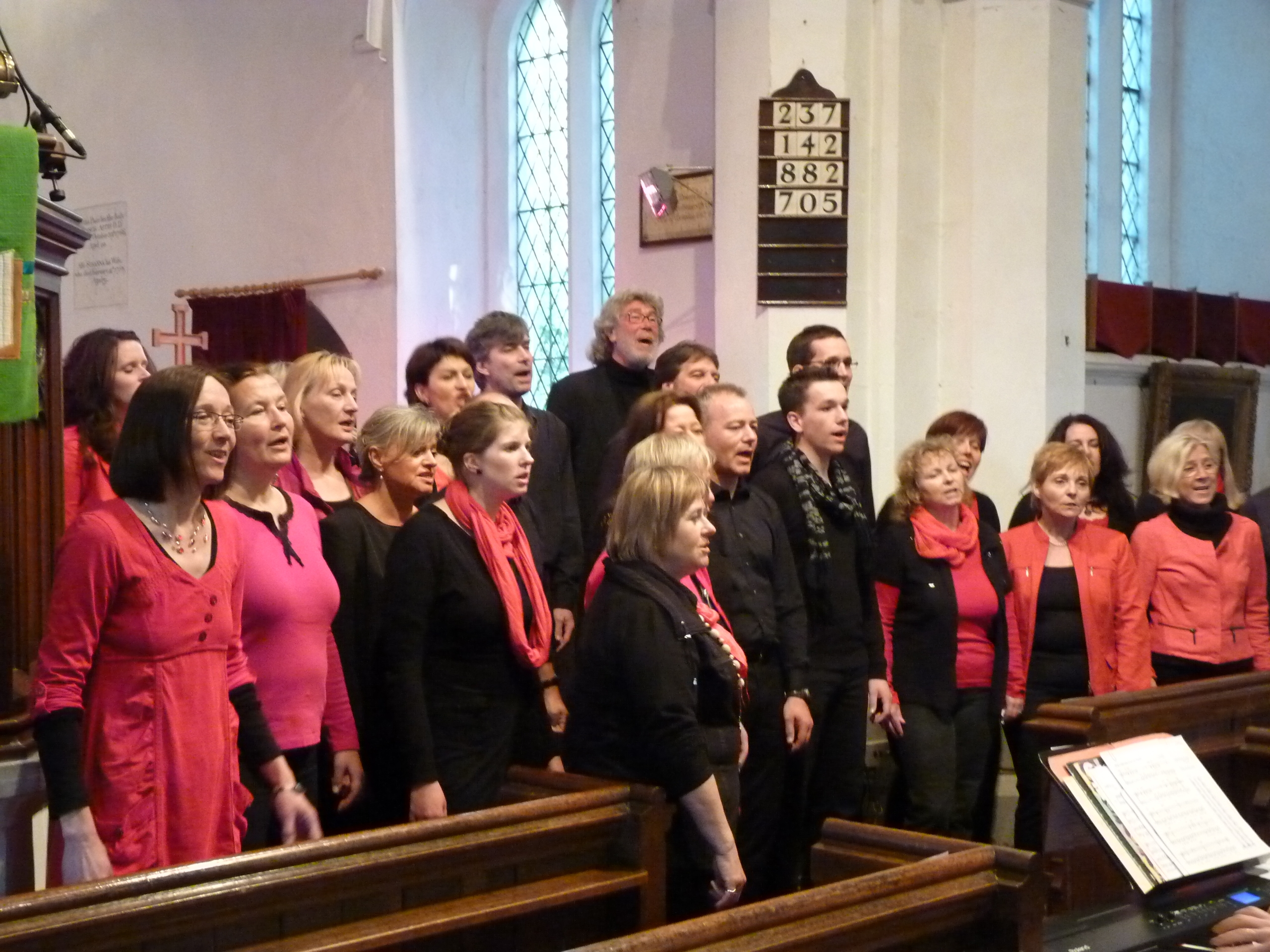
Niu Quaia singing in St. Andrew's Church, Ampthill, U.K. in 2013.

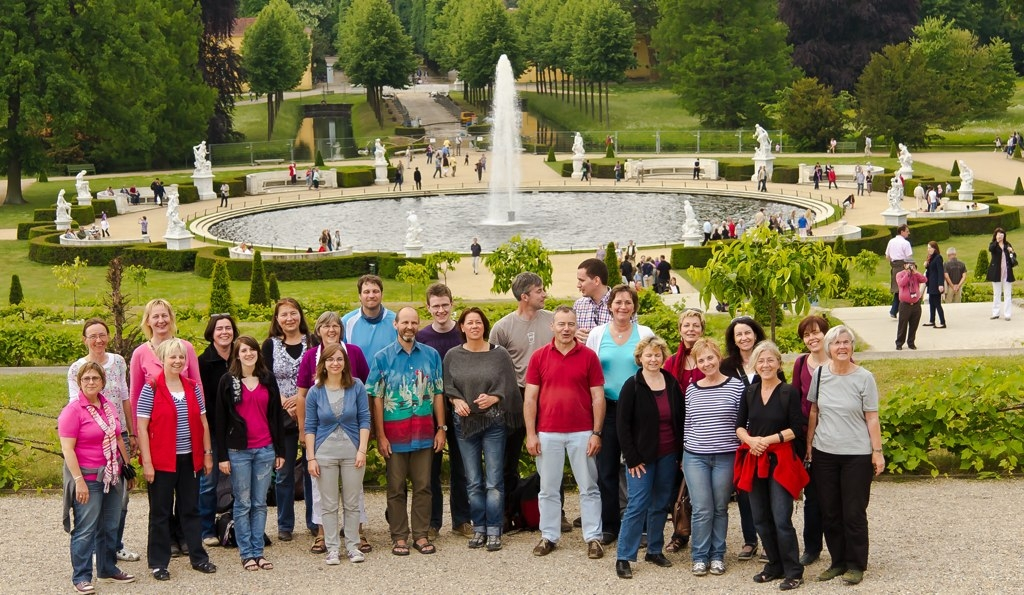
Niu Quaia visiting the Sansouci park after their Berlin concert in May 2011.

== Concerts ==
- Old Botanical Garden of Göttingen University, Göttingen, 2 September 2012
- Edermunde-Grifte Church, 23. February 2013
- St. Andrew's Church, Ampthill, Bedfordshire, UK, 31 May 2013
- St. Mary Magdalene Church, Westoning, UK, 1 June 2013
- part of Fünf Chöre – Ein Klang (engl. five choirs – one sound), Vellmar, Sommer-im-Park, 21 August 2013
- Jubilee Besse Choral Society, Besse, 25 May 2014
- Old Botanical Garden of Göttingen University, Göttingen, 22 June 2014
- 125-year Jubilee 'Gesangvereins 1889 Grifte', Edermunde-Grifte Church, 6 July 2014

== Press reviews ==
- Concert in the Old Botanical Garden of Göttingen University, 15 June 2008
- Concert in Rotenberg Martin-Luther Church, 17 February 2010
- Concert at Town Partnership Meeting of Felsberg und Vernouillet, 7 June 2010
- "Sommer im Park" Performance in Vellmar, 21 August 2013
- "Sommer im Park" Performance in Vellmar, 21 August 2013
- Jubilee of the Grifte Choral Society, 26 January 2014
- 125-year Jubilee of the Grifte Choral Society in 2014
