= Gerhard Lang =

German botanist (1924–2016)

Gerhard Lang (* October 21, 1924, in Ravensburg; † June 19, 2016, in Biberach an der Riß) was a German botanist with a research focus on vegetation ecology, geobotany, and vegetation history of the Quaternary.

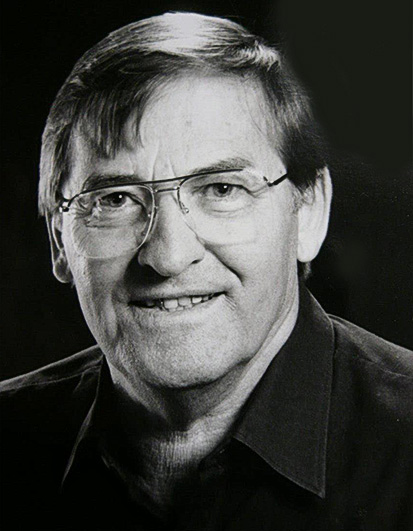
Gerhard Lang (1985)

== Personal life and academic career ==
During his high school years in Ravensburg, Lang was one of the students of Karl Bertsch. He started his studies on botany and zoology with minors in chemistry and physics at the University of Freiburg in 1946 and changed to the University of Göttingen where he received the PhD degree in Biology in 1952 for his study on the late-glacial history of the vegetation and flora of southwestern Germany, supervised by Franz Firbas. Between 1952 and 1975 Lang worked at the Landessammlungen für Naturkunde (today: Staatliches Museum für Naturkunde) in Karlsruhe as curator and as deputy director of the museum. In 1962 Lang became lecturer in Geobotany at the University of Karlsruhe and in 1966 he submitted his habilitation thesis on the macrophyte vegetation of Lake Constance. Karlsruhe University appointed him professor at the Botanical Institute in 1972. In 1975 he was appointed full professor and director of the Systematisch-Geobotanisches Institut and Bern Botanical Garden, University of Bern, Switzerland, succeeding Max Welten. In 1989, after Lang’s retirement and becoming professor emeritus he moved back to southern Germany, the region where he grew up.

== Research trips and study visits ==
Lang travelled widely as part of his research and botanical activities, including visits to the French Massif Central in 1956; Botany School Cambridge, UK in 1959; the Australian Alps and Australian National University, Canberra in 1965; Siberia in 1971; Armenia in 1975; western Canada and western USA in 1978; tropical and central Australia in 1981; and Argentina in 1983.

== Research ==
During his time in Karlsruhe, Lang’s research focus lay on vegetation mapping at the scale of 1:25,000 based on classical plant sociological relevés of the Upper Rhine Plain, the Black Forest, and the Lake Constance region as well as the study of lake and mire deposits with regard to the vegetation history of south-western Germany. During his time in Bern his research centred on the Alpine region with special reference to the study of dynamic vegetation processes and climate change in the past, as well as the development of multi-proxy approaches in palaeoecology. He introduced new equipment and methodologies, especially with regard to subaquatic coring from a raft that allowed sediment sampling from the centre of lakes, which provided new insights into local and regional reconstructions of past environmental conditions. Consequently, his research on vegetation ecology and history made the transition to modern multi-proxy palaeoecology. After his retirement, Lang published a major text on European Quaternary vegetation history.

== Selected bibliography ==
- Lang, G.(1952) Zur späteiszeitlichen Vegetations- und Florengeschichte Südwestdeutschlands. Flora 139: 243-294.
- Lang, G. und Trautmann, W. (1961) Zur spät- und nacheiszeitlichen Vegetationsgeschichte der Auvergne (franz. Zentralmassiv). Flora 150: 111-142
- Lang, G.(1970) Die Vegetation der Brindabella Range bei Canberra. Eine pflanzensoziologische Studie aus dem südaustralischen Hartlaubgebiet. Akademie der Wissenschaften und der Literatur Mainz, Abh.Math- Naturwiss, Kl.1, 1-98.
- Lang, G.(1970) Florengeschichte und mediterran-mitteleuropäische Florenbeziehungen. Feddes Repertorium 81: 315-335.
- Lang, G.(1973) Die Vegetation des westlichen Bodenseegebietes. Pflanzensoziologie 17, 451.
- Lang, G.(1973) Die Vegetation des westlichen Bodenseegebietes. Fischer, Jena, 451 pp.
- Lang, G.(1975) Die Makrophytenvegetation des Bodensees als Zeiger für den Gütezustand - neuere Entwicklungen. Daten und Dokumente zum Umweltschutz 14: 39-49.
- Lang, G.(1975) Palynologische, grossrestanalytische und paläolimnologische Untersuchungen im Schwarzwald – eine Arbeitsprogramm. Beitr. naturk. Forsch. Südw.-Dtld, 34, 201-208.
- Lang, G.(1981) Die submersen Makrophyten des Bodensees - 1978 im Vergleich mit 1967. Bericht der internationalen Gewässerschutzkommission für den Bodensee 26: 1-64.
- Lang, G.(1984) Festschriften Max Welten. Dissertationes Botanicae 72: 1-525
- Lang, G.(Ed.)(1985) Swiss lake and mire environments during the last 15 000 years. J.Cramer, Vaduz.428.
- Lang, G. und Schlüchter, C. (1988) Lake, Mire and River Environments during the last 15 000 years. Balkema, Rotterdam, 229 pp.
- Lang, G.(1992) Some aspects of European late- and postglacial flor History. Acta Botannica Fennica 144: 1-17
- Lang, G.(1994). Quartäre Vegetationsgeschichte Europas. G.Fischer, Jena. 462.
- Lang, G. (2005). Seen und Moore des Schwarzwaldes. Andrias 16. 160.
- Collective document: Lotter, André; Ammann, Brigitta; Schloss, Siegfried; Tinner, Willy (2016). Gerhard Lang (21.10.1924-19.06.2016). Vegetation History and Archaeobotany, 25(6), pp. 521–523. Springer 10.1007/s00334-016-0588-5
