= Firbas =

Firbas is a surname. Notable people with the surname include:

- Franz Firbas (1902–1964), German botanist
- Jan Firbas (1921–1945), Czech linguist
