= New Botanic Garden of Göttingen University =

Research botanical garden in Lower Saxony, Germany

Coordinates: 51°33′28.08″N 9°57′44.28″E

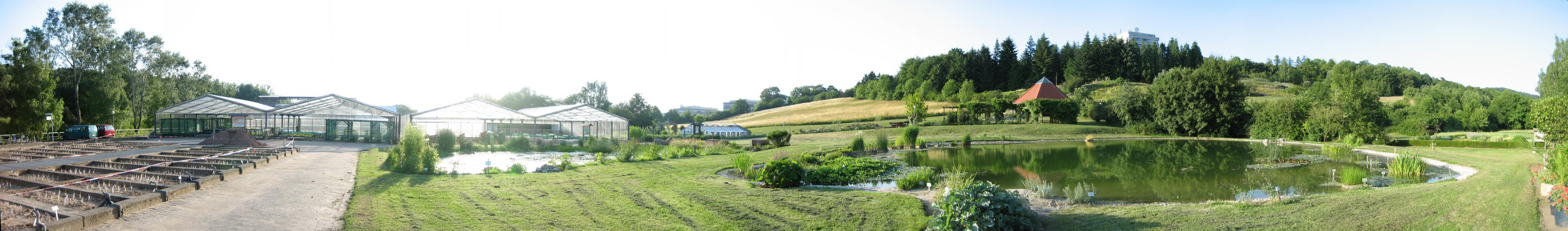
Neuer Botanischer Garten der Universität Göttingen

The Neuer Botanischer Garten der Universität Göttingen (36 hectares), also known as the Experimenteller Botanischer Garten, is a research botanical garden maintained by the University of Göttingen. It is located immediately adjacent to the university's Forstbotanischer Garten und Arboretum at Grisebachstraße 1, Göttingen, Lower Saxony, Germany, and open daily without charge.

The garden was established by Prof. Heinz Ellenberg (1913–1997) in 1967 as an experimental facility to augment the historic Alter Botanischer Garten der Universität Göttingen. In 2009 its name was changed to the Experimenteller Botanischer Garten.

The garden contains special collections of Centaurea and related genera, native flora of Central Europe, holarctic forest vegetation, endangered wild plants, and rare weeds, as well as an alpine garden (5000 m^{2}), wild rose collection, and pond (400 m^{2}) with aquatic and swamp plants.

== See also ==
- Old Botanical Garden of Göttingen University
- Forstbotanischer Garten und Pflanzengeographisches Arboretum der Universität Göttingen
- List of botanical gardens in Germany
