= Forstbotanischer Garten in Hannoversch Münden =

Forest botanical garden and arboretum in Germany

Coordinates: 51.4150°N 9.6595°E

The Forstbotanischer Garten in Hannoversch Münden (2.87 hectares) is a forest botanical garden and arboretum located at Mitscherlichstraße 5, Hannoversch Münden, Lower Saxony, Germany.

The garden was established in 1868 at the founding of the Royal Prussian Academy of Forestry Hann. Münden, and formally opened in 1870 on a site of 5.25 hectares. It fell into disuse during World War I, and after its destruction by air raids in World War II was used for vegetable cultivation. In 1962, the garden was reestablished on 4.3 hectares with about 1700 tree and shrub species, but after the academy moved to Göttingen in 1970, it was again abandoned. It reopened in 1988 on 2.87 hectares, and since 2005 has been maintained by the Lower Saxony Forestry Service (Niedersächsische Landesforsten) Münden. It currently contains 754 trees and shrubs under special protection.

== See also ==
- List of botanical gardens in Germany
- Forstbotanischer Garten und Pflanzengeographisches Arboretum der Universität Göttingen
