= Streimanniella =

Scientific classification
- Kingdom: Fungi
- Division: Ascomycota
- Class: Lecanoromycetes
- Order: Teloschistales
- Family: Teloschistaceae
- Genus: Streimanniella; S.Y.Kondr., Kärnefelt, A.Thell, Elix & Hur (2015)

Type species
- Streimanniella michelagoensis (Elix, S.Y.Kondr. & Kärnefelt) S.Y.Kondr., Kärnefelt, A.Thell, Elix, J.Kim, A.S.Kondr. & Hur (2015)

Species
- S. asserigena S. burneyensis S. kalbiorum S. michelagoensis S. seppeltii S. tomnashii

Genus of lichen-forming fungi

Streimanniella is a genus of lichen-forming fungi in the family Teloschistaceae. It includes six species of crustose lichens, recorded mainly from Australia, with S. asserigena also known from Europe. Species in this genus form a crust-like thallus ranging from white to dark brownish-grey, with blackish to orange-brown fruiting bodies. Its taxonomic placement has been debated, but molecular studies recover it as a distinct genus within the subfamily Caloplacoideae.

== Taxonomy ==
The genus was circumscribed in 2015 by lichenologists Sergey Kondratyuk, Ingvar Kärnefelt, Arne Thell, John Elix, and Jae-Seoun Hur. It was introduced for species that had been treated as part of the Caloplaca michelagoensis species complex. The genus name honours Heinar Streimann (1938–2001), an Australian bryologist and lichen collector.

Some later sources treated Streimanniella as a synonym of Marchantiana, and Wilk and colleagues (2021) questioned whether the original sequence data reflected Teloschistaceae. Kondratyuk and co-authors (2025) reported new sequence data for the type species, S. michelagoensis, and recovered it in the subfamily Caloplacoideae as a well-supported lineage sister to the Marchantiana branch, supporting continued recognition of Streimanniella as a separate genus. In the same study, two additional species were transferred to Streimanniella: S. asserigena (previously treated as Marchantiana asserigena) and S. tomnashii (based on Caloplaca tomnashii).

Kondratyuk and colleagues suggested that Streimanniella was part of a subfamily Brownlielloideae, but subsequent molecular research has disputed the validity of this subfamily.

== Description ==
Streimanniella has a crust-like thallus that can be continuous or divided into small, discrete patches (areoles); it ranges in colour from white and grey to dark brownish-grey. The apothecia are lecanorine or zeorine, with a thalline margin similar in colour to the thallus and a thin cortex of tightly packed cells. The disc is blackish, dirty brown, orange-brown, or occasionally the same colour as the thallus. The true exciple is composed of tightly interwoven tissue, and its outer parts tend to be brownish. The asci may contain 2, 4, 6, or 8 spores; the spores are polarilocular and often become brownish to blackish while still in the asci. The epihymenium turns purple with potassium hydroxide solution (the K spot test), consistent with the presence of neochloroemodin.

Streimanniella resembles Marchantiana in general habit but differs in its apothecial structure and chemistry. It is characterised by lecanorine or zeorine apothecia and by neochloroemodin, and it lacks ascomatic acid and related dibenzofuran compounds reported from some allied taxa.

== Species ==
Streimanniella includes six species, recorded mainly from Australia:

- S. asserigena (J.Lahm) S.Y.Kondr., Kärnefelt, L.Lőkös & A.Thell (2025)
- S. burneyensis (S.Y.Kondr. & Kärnefelt) S.Y.Kondr., Kärnefelt, A.Thell, Elix, J.Kim, A.S.Kondr. & Hur (2015)
- S. kalbiorum (S.Y.Kondr. & Kärnefelt) S.Y.Kondr., Kärnefelt, A.Thell, Elix, J.Kim, A.S.Kondr. & Hur (2015)
- S. michelagoensis (Elix, S.Y.Kondr. & Kärnefelt) S.Y.Kondr., Kärnefelt, A.Thell, Elix, J.Kim, A.S.Kondr. & Hur (2015)
- S. seppeltii (S.Y.Kondr. & Kärnefelt) S.Y.Kondr., Kärnefelt, A.Thell, Elix, J.Kim, A.S.Kondr. & Hur (2015)
- S. tomnashii (S.Y.Kondr., Elix & Kärnefelt) S.Y.Kondr., Kärnefelt, L.Lőkös & A.Thell (2025)
