= Heinz Ellenberg =

German botanist (1913–1997)

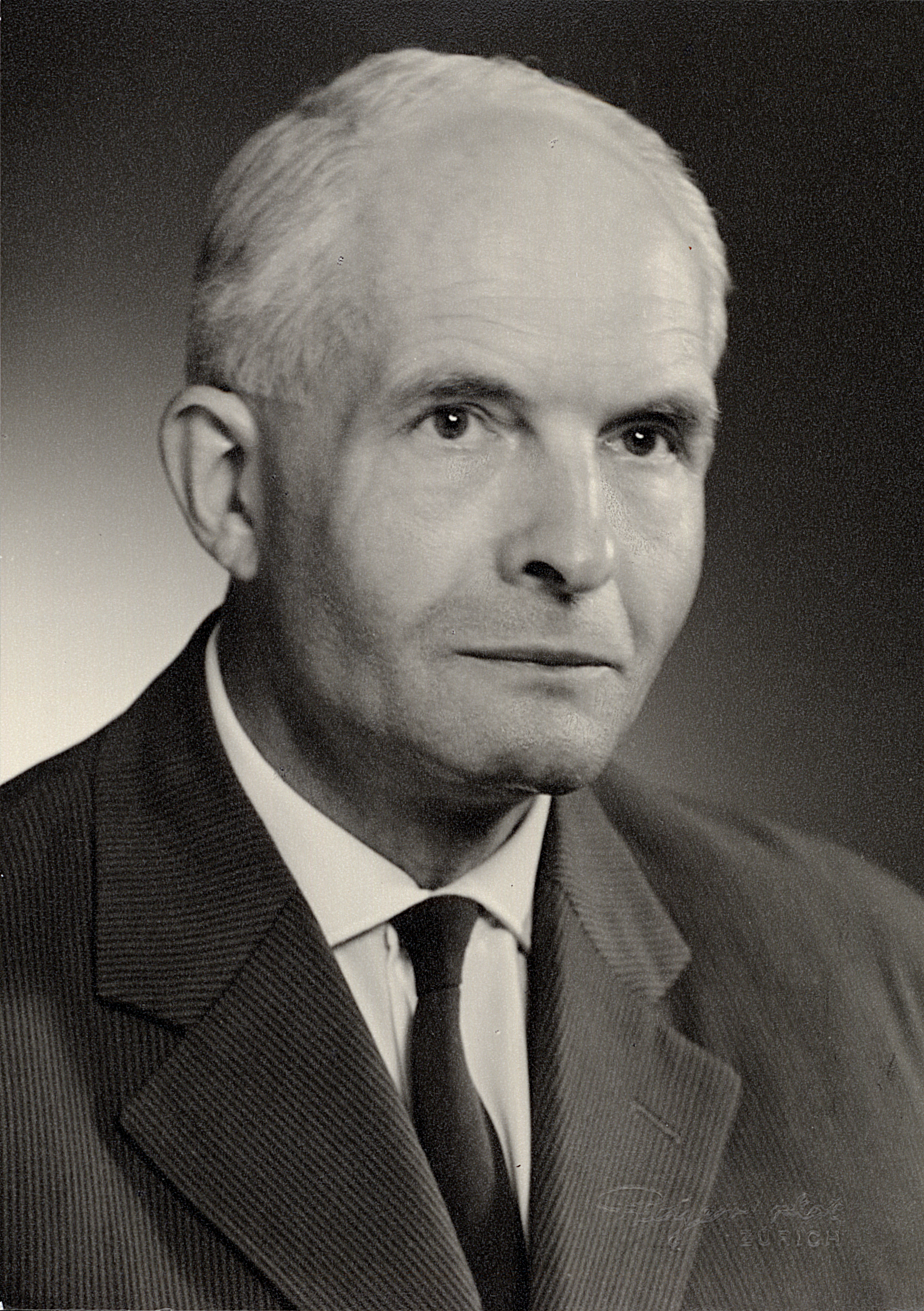
- Born: 1 August 1913; Hamburg
- Died: 2 May 1997
- Occupations: University teacher, botanist, scientist
- Political party: Nazi Party

Heinz Ellenberg (1 August 1913 in Harburg (Elbe) – 2 May 1997 in Göttingen) was a German biologist, botanist and ecologist. Ellenberg was an advocate of viewing ecological systems through holistic means. He developed 9–point scales for rating European plant preferences for light, temperature, continentality (geographic region), nutrients, soil moisture, pH, and salinity.

== Life ==
Ellenberg's father (a school teacher) died during World War I in 1914. From 1920 to 1932 Ellenberg studied in Hanover, where his interest in local flora and fauna was established, and where he came in contact with Reinhold Tüxen.

In 1932 he moved to Montpellier, where he started his studies of ecology under the direction of Swiss ecologist Josias Braun-Blanquet. Later he studied botany, zoology, chemistry and geology in Heidelberg, Hanover and Göttingen, where he obtained a doctorate in biology in 1938 in Göttingen under Franz Firbas.

After completing his doctorate he worked at the central office for vegetation mapping in Hannover under the direction of Reinhold Tüxen and during World War II served in a "research relay". Ellenberg successfully worked on developing roof plantings of bunkers that would allow them to blend in with landscape and deceive hostile airplanes. These proceeded from layers of earth up to two meters thick, which are still visible today.

After the war he served as an assistant of Heinrich Walter in Stuttgart. In 1953 he became a professor at the University of Hamburg. From 1958 he was a director at Department of Botany at the ETH Zurich.

Heinz Ellenberg was among the first to experimentally show the importance of a distinction between fundamental niche and realized niche for plants. He experimentally grew two species of Bromus along a moisture gradient and showed that, in monoculture, both species were able to inhabit the entire range. Nevertheless, in mixture, the two species dissociated and showed clear preference for either the dry or the moist end of the gradient

In 1966 he moved to the University of Göttingen, where he established the Neuer Botanischer Garten der Universität Göttingen. He became emeritus in 1981. From 1982 to 1986, he served as president of the International Association for Vegetation Science (IAVS). He is an Honorary Member of the International Association for Vegetation Science (1988).

== Personal life ==
In 1941 he married Charlotte Metelmann. After retiring, he ran a farmhouse. In 1996 he published a revised edition of "Vegetation Mitteleuropas mit den Alpen in ökologischer, dynamischer und historischer Sicht".

== Bibliography ==
- Vegetation Mitteleuropas mit den Alpen in ökologischer, dynamischer und historischer Sicht. Stuttgart: Ulmer 1996 (5. Auflage; 1. Auflage: 1963), ISBN 3-8252-8104-3
- with Christoph Leuschner: Ecology of Central European Forests Vegetation Ecology of Central Europe, Volume I. Springer International Publishing Switzerland 2017, ISBN 978-3-319-43042-3 (translated into English and expanded edition of Vegetation Mitteleuropas mit den Alpen)
- also with Christoph Leuschner: Ecology of Central European Non-Forest Vegetation: Coastal to Alpine, Natural to Man-Made Habitats, Springer International Publishing Switzerland 2017, ISBN 978-3-319-43048-5 (is also based on the German edition Vegetation Mitteleuropas mit den Alpen)
- Zeigerwerte nach Ellenberg|Zeigerwerte von Pflanzen in Mitteleuropa. - Scripta Geobotanica 1974, 1979 und 1992, ISBN 3-88452-518-2
- Bauernhaus und Landschaft in ökologischer und historischer Sicht. Stuttgart Ulmer 1990, ISBN 3-8001-3087-4
- Unkrautgemeinschaften als Zeiger für Klima und Boden. Landwirtschaftliche Pflanzensoziologie I. Stuttgart: Ulmer 1950
- (co-author) Vegetation Südosteuropas. München: Urban & Fischer 1974, ISBN 3-437-30168-3
- Wiesen und Weiden und ihre standörtliche Bewertung. Stuttgart: Ulmer 1952
- Aufgaben und Methoden der Vegetationskunde. Stuttgart: Ulmer 1956
- (Ed.) Ökosystemforschung. Heidelberg, Berlin, New York: Springer Verlag 1973
- Ökologische Beiträge zur Umweltgestaltung. Stuttgart: Ulmer 1983
