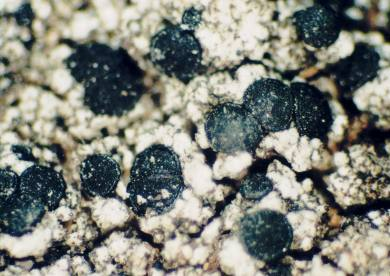

Conservation status
- Secure (NatureServe)

Scientific classification
- Kingdom: Fungi
- Division: Ascomycota
- Class: Lecanoromycetes
- Order: Lecanorales
- Family: Lecanoraceae
- Genus: Lecidella
- Species: L. carpathica

Binomial name
- Lecidella carpathica Körb. (1861)

Synonyms
- List: Lecidea latypiza Nyl. (1872); Lecidea parasema subsp. latypiza (Nyl.) Nyl. (1873); Celidium varians f. carpathicum (Körb.) Arnold (1874); Lecidea parasema var. latypiza (Nyl.) Wedd. (1875); Celidium varians var. carpathicum (Körb.) Arnold (1877); Lecidea latypea f. latypiza (Nyl.) Vain. (1878); Lecidea parasema f. latypiza (Nyl.) Leight. (1879); Arthonia varians var. carpathica (Körb.) Willey (1890); Lecidea latypea var. latypiza (Nyl.) Brisson (1891); Lecidea carpathica (Körb.) Szatala (1916); Lecidea goniophila subsp. latypiza (Nyl.) Harm. (1899); Lecidella latypiza (Nyl.) M.Choisy (1950)

= Lecidella carpathica =

Species of lichen-forming fungus

Lecidella carpathica is a species of crustose lichen in the family Lecanoraceae. It was formally described as a new species in 1861 by the German lichenologist Gustav Wilhelm Körber.

Three secondary metabolites that occur in this species, hopane-6α,22-diol, brialmontin, and atraric acid, inhibit the enzyme protein tyrosine phosphatase 1B. This enzyme is a therapeutic target for diabetes treatments and plays a major role in negative regulation of the insulin signaling pathway.

In Nepal, Lecidella carpathica has been reported from 3,900 to 4,000 m elevation in a compilation of published records.
