= Yoshimuria seokpoensis =

Scientific classification
- Kingdom: Fungi
- Division: Ascomycota
- Class: Lecanoromycetes
- Order: Teloschistales
- Family: Teloschistaceae
- Genus: Yoshimuria
- Species: Y. seokpoensis

Binomial name
- Yoshimuria seokpoensis S.Y.Kondr., Lőkös & Hur (2019)
- Holotype: Ulleungdo, South Korea

Species of lichen

Yoshimuria seokpoensis is a species of saxicolous (rock-dwelling), crustose lichen in the family Teloschistaceae. It is only known to occur on South Korea's Ulleungdo Island, where it grows on siliceous rock.

== Taxonomy ==
Yoshimuria seokpoensis was scientifically described by the lichenologists Sergey Kondratyuk, László Lőkös, and Jae-Seoun Hur in 2019. The type specimen was collected on Ulleungdo Island in Gyeongsangbukdo in South Korea. It was found on siliceous rock between Naesujeon and Seokpo Waterfall at an elevation of approximately 480 m (1,570 ft) above sea level. The species epithet, seokpoensis, is derived from the Seokpo area on Ulleungdo Island, referencing the location where it was first discovered.

== Description ==
Yoshimuria seokpoensis forms a thallus that ranges from 10–15 cm (4–6 in) across, though it can aggregate into larger formations. The thallus surface is continuous or with small cracks, which are up to 0.05 mm wide and confined to the cortical layer and algal zone. The surface is more or less even, covering the undulations of the rock beneath it. Its upper surface is dull greyish, dirty whitish-grey, or greenish, and can become yellowish-green when treated with potassium hydroxide solution. The hypothallus is black.

The apothecia (fruiting bodies) measure between 0.3 and 1.2 mm in diameter. They are typically round, scattered, and raised above the thallus. These structures have a bright yellow to dull yellow-orange margin that remains distinct over time. The disc of the apothecia is generally even and ranges in colour from greyish or grey-brownish-yellow to blackish-yellow, contrasting with the lighter edge. The apothecium structure includes a true exciple and a hymenium with distinct brownish inclusions in the lower portion. Conidiomata, which produce asexual spores, appear as blackish dots up to 0.2 mm in diameter, but conidia (asexual spores) have not been observed to occur in this species.

The thallus shows varied reactions under ultraviolet light, appearing dull whitish, and its chemical spot test reactions are mostly negative. However, when treated with potassium hydroxide solution, parts of the apothecium turn purple.

== Similar species ==
Yoshimuria seokpoensis is closely related to several other East Asian endemic species. One of the most similar species is Yoshimuria galbina, which is found in South Korea and Japan. While both species share many characteristics, Y. seokpoensis can be distinguished by its biatorine apothecia, which lack a thalline exciple, compared to the zeorine apothecia of Y. galbina. Additionally, Y. seokpoensis has a more developed true exciple, narrower paraphysis tips, and wider ascospores. Unlike Y. galbina, Y. seokpoensis does not show a yellow reaction to potassium hydroxide, indicating the absence of atranorin in its thallus.

Another similar species is Yoshimuria spodoplaca, also endemic to South Korea and Japan. Y. seokpoensis differs from Y. spodoplaca by having a continuous and uniformly colored thallus, rather than one that is zoned, fragmented, and exfoliated.

Additionally, mature specimens of Y. seokpoensis may resemble Caloplaca pulcherrima, a species known from New Zealand and Australia. However, Y. seokpoensis has smaller, differently coloured apothecia and a more distinct, brighter yellow margin compared to the blood-red apothecia of C. pulcherrima. Furthermore, Y. seokpoensis has larger ascospores and lacks the schizidia-like isidia and irregularly shaped thalline grains found in C. pulcherrima.
