= Nadezhdino, Kaltasinsky District, Republic of Bashkortostan =

Nadezhdino Надеждино
- Selo
- Location within Bashkortostan Location within Russia
- Coordinates: 55°51′N 54°52′E
- Country: Russia
- Region: Bashkortostan
- District: Kaltasinsky District
- Time zone: UTC+5:00

Nadezhdino (Russian: Надеждино) is a rural locality (a selo) in Kalmiyabashevsky Selsoviet, Kaltasinsky District, Bashkortostan, Russia. The population was 66 as of 2010. There are 2 streets.

== Geography ==
Nadezhdino is located 27 km southeast of Kaltasy (the district's administrative centre) by road. Baryaza is the nearest rural locality.
