= Roman Türk =

Austrian lichenologist and plant ecophysiologist (born 1945)

- Born: April 14, 1945 (age 81); Střemily, Nazi Germany
- Education: University of Vienna
- Known for: Lichen bioindication and atlas mapping in Austria; ecophysiology of alpine and Antarctic lichens
- Scientific career
- Fields: Lichenology; plant ecophysiology
- Workplaces: University of Salzburg
- Author abbrev. (botany): Türk

Roman Türk (born 14 April 1945) is an Austrian lichenologist and plant ecophysiologist noted for combining classical floristics with experimental physiology. He taught for decades at the University of Salzburg and became a central organiser of lichen research and mapping in Austria, especially the use of lichens as bioindicators of air quality. From 1994 to 2002, he served as the first chair of the Bryologisch-lichenologische Arbeitsgemeinschaft für Mitteleuropa (BLAM). He co‑authored the national checklist of Austrian lichenised fungi (2001) and later worked on lichen ecology in continental Antarctica. By 2017 his bibliography comprised more than 270 publications, including several books and regional floras.

== Life and career ==
Roman Türk was born on April 14, 1945 in Střemily (German: Richterhof) in the Nazi Germany-annexed part of Czechoslovakia (now non-existent village in the Boletice Military Training Area in the Czech Republic). He grew up in Steyr, Upper Austria. He studied biology at the University of Vienna (major in botany, minor in zoology) and earned a Dr. phil. in 1971 with a dissertation on climatic effects on water potential in higher plants, supervised by the botanist Richard Biebl.

Immediately after the doctorate he joined the University of Würzburg as a research assistant in Otto Ludwig Lange's group, investigating sulphur dioxide effects on lichens and their gas exchange; several early papers with Volkmar Wirth stem from this period. In 1975 Türk moved to the University of Salzburg, where he built an experimental laboratory on CO_{2} exchange in plants and increasingly focused on lichens. He habilitated in 1980 (Laboratory investigations on the CO_{2} gas exchange of lichens from the Central Eastern Alps), became head of the Plant Ecophysiology unit in 1982 and was appointed associate professor in 1983. He later led the newly created Institute of Plant Physiology (1991–1993) and, within the reorganised faculty, served as deputy chair of "Organismal Biology" and head of the group "Ecology and Diversity of Plants" (2004–2009). Türk has been a member of the European Academy of Sciences and Arts since 2014 and served as president from 2011 to 2023 of Naturschutzbund Österreich.

== Research and contributions ==
Türk's work spans two main tracks. First, he advanced applied lichenology in Austria: beginning in the 1970s he used lichens as bioindicators of air pollution, led surveys that underpinned air‑quality assessments in several cities, and helped launch systematic grid‑mapping of the country's lichen biota, producing atlases and provincial lists (e.g., Upper Austria, Salzburg, Lower Austria, Vorarlberg and Carinthia, as well as the Berchtesgaden area). Second, he pursued experimental and field studies on the ecophysiology of high‑mountain lichens, particularly CO_{2} exchange and survival strategies at environmental limits, and from 2000 participated in international projects on lichen diversity and stress tolerance in continental Antarctica, where he documented some of the southernmost lichen sites (near 84° S on Mount Kyffin).

Beyond research, Türk has been active in scientific service and public outreach. He was the first chair of BLAM (1994–2002), organised excursions and meetings, and for many years led the Salzburg branch of the Austrian Nature Conservation Association, writing popular pieces on botanical conservation. He co‑authored the Austrian checklist of lichenised fungi (2001) and edited and compiled several regional syntheses and guides. According to a later biographical note, by 2017 he had produced over 270 publications, among them five books.

== Recognition ==
In 2019, Türk was awarded the Josef Ressel Forestry Prize, with the laudation describing him as a leading figure in lichen research and an early adopter of lichen bioindication in Austria's forest damage work and protection strategy. The Bavarian Conservation Prize (the organisation's highest award) went to Türk in 2023, praising his bridge-building between academic lichenology and the conservation movement, and his public communication and education work.

Three lichen species have been named in honour of Türk: Gyalideopsis tuerkii Vězda (2003); Minutoexcipula tuerkii Hafellner (1994); and Verrucaria tuerkii Breuss (1993).

== Selected works ==
- Türk, Roman; Wirth, Volkmar (1975). "The pH dependence of SO_{2} damage to lichens". Oecologia. 19 (4): 285–291. doi:10.1007/BF00348104. PMID 28309240.
- Türk, Roman (1990). "Lichen mapping in Austria". Stuttgarter Beiträge zur Naturkunde, Series A (456): 67–72.
- Türk, Roman; Breuss, Othmar; Üblagger, Josef (1998). "Die Flechten im Bundesland Niederösterreich" [The lichens of the province of Lower Austria] (PDF). Wissenschaftliche Mitteilungen aus dem Niederösterreichischen Landesmuseum (in German). 11: 7–313.
- Reiter, Raimund; Türk, Roman (2000). "Investigations on the CO_{2} exchange of lichens in the alpine belt. I. Comparative patterns of net CO2 exchange in Cladonia mitis, Thamnolia vermicularis and Umbilicaria cylindrica". In Schroeter, B.; Schlensog, M.; Green, T.G.A. (eds.). New aspects in cryptogamic research. Contributions in honour of Ludger Kappen. Bibliotheca Lichenologica. Vol. 75. Berlin; Stuttgart: J. Cramer. pp. 333–351.
- Hafellner, Josef; Türk, Roman (2001). "Die lichenisierten Pilze Österreichs – eine Checkliste der bisher nachgewiesenen Arten mit Verbreitungsangaben" [The lichenised fungi of Austria – a checklist of the species recorded so far with distributional data]. Stapfia (in German). 76: 1–167.
- Türk, Roman; Uhl, Andrea (2003). "Die Verbreitung der Gattungen Lasallia und Umbilicaria in Österreich". In Jensen, M. (ed.). Lichenological contributions in honour of G. B. Feige [The distribution of the genera Lasallia and Umbilicaria in Austria]. Bibliotheca Lichenologica (in German). Vol. 86. Berlin; Stuttgart: J. Cramer. pp. 465–483.
- Wirtz, N.; Lumbsch, H.T.; Green, T.G.A.; Türk, Roman; Pintado, A.; Sancho, L.; Schroeter, B. (2003). "Lichen fungi have low cyanobiont selectivity in maritime Antarctica". New Phytologist. 160 (1): 177–183. doi:10.1046/j.1469-8137.2003.00859.x. PMID 33873530.
- Türk, Roman; Hafellner, Josef; Taurer-Zeiner, Christian (2004). Die Flechten Kärntens: Eine Bestandsaufnahme nach mehr als einem Jahrhundert lichenologischer Forschungen [The lichens of Carinthia: a survey after more than a century of lichenological research]. Sonderreihe Natur Kärnten (in German). Vol. 2. Klagenfurt: Naturwissenschaftlicher Verein für Kärnten.
