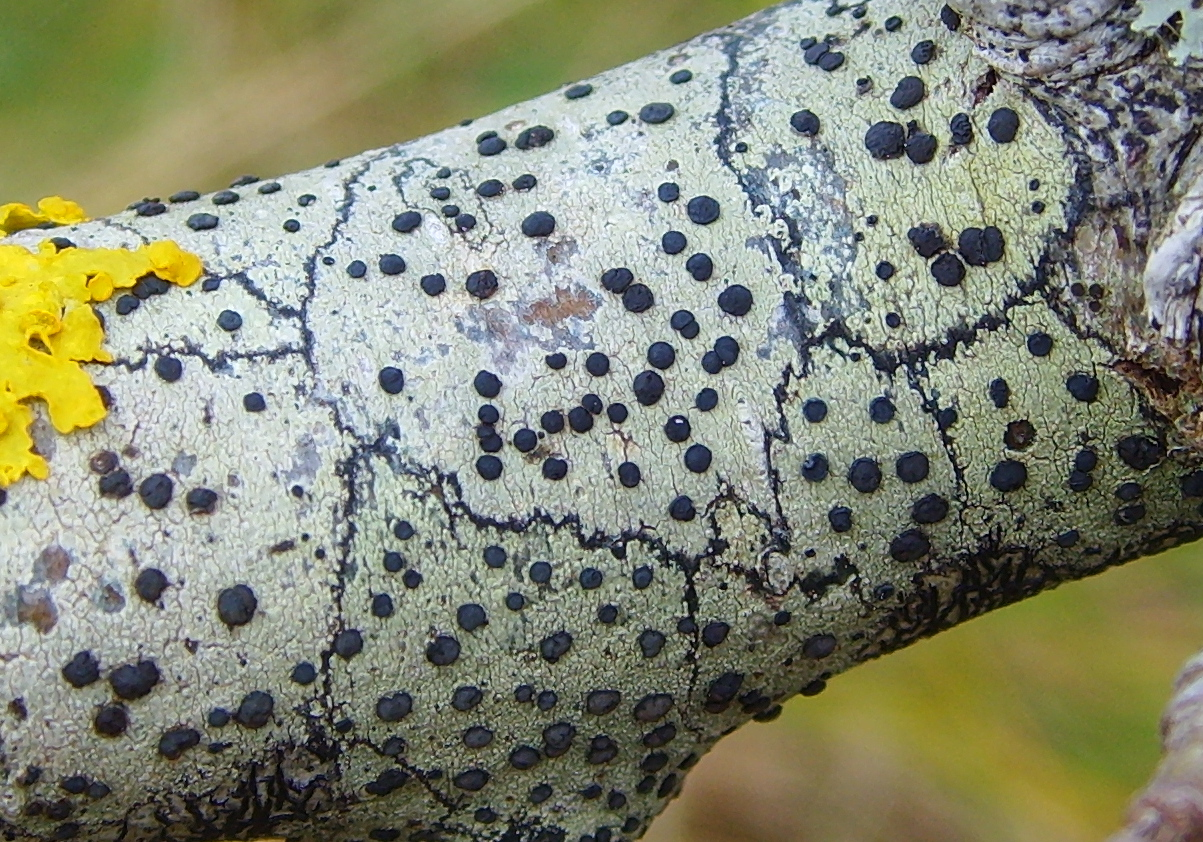
- Lecidella elaeochroma

Scientific classification
- Kingdom: Fungi
- Division: Ascomycota
- Class: Lecanoromycetes
- Order: Lecanorales
- Family: Lecanoraceae
- Genus: Lecidella; Körb. (1855)

Type species
- Lecidella viridans (Flot.) Körb. (1855)

Synonyms
- Lecideola A.Massal. (1861); Diplophragmia Vain. (1934); Lecidellomyces E.A.Thomas (1939)

= Lecidella =

Genus of lichen-forming fungi

Lecidella is a genus of crustose lichens in the family Lecanoraceae.

== Taxonomy ==
Lecidella was circumscribed by German lichenologist Gustav Wilhelm Körber in 1855. It was not widely used until more than a century later, when Hannes Hertel recognized it first as a subgenus of Lecidea, and then a couple of year after as a distinct genus.

A phylogenetic analysis of the genus using 11 species (mostly from China) found that Lecidella species fall into three major clades, which were proposed as three informal groups: Lecidella stigmatea group, L. elaeochroma group and L. enteroleucella group.

== Description ==
Lecidella species have a thallus that is crustose, and biatorine, meaning that it resembles the genus Biatora–having a proper exciple, which is not coal-black (carbonised, but coloured or blackening. It has eight-spored asci of the Lecidella type. The ascospores are simple and hyaline, while the conidia are curved and threadlike.

Morphologically similar genera include Japewiella, Carbonea, and Tasmidella.

== Species ==
Lecidella was estimated to contain about 80 species in a popular 2008 text, a number that was used in a (2020) survey of fungal classification. As of November 2024, Species Fungorum (in the Catalogue of Life) accepts 40 species in the genus.

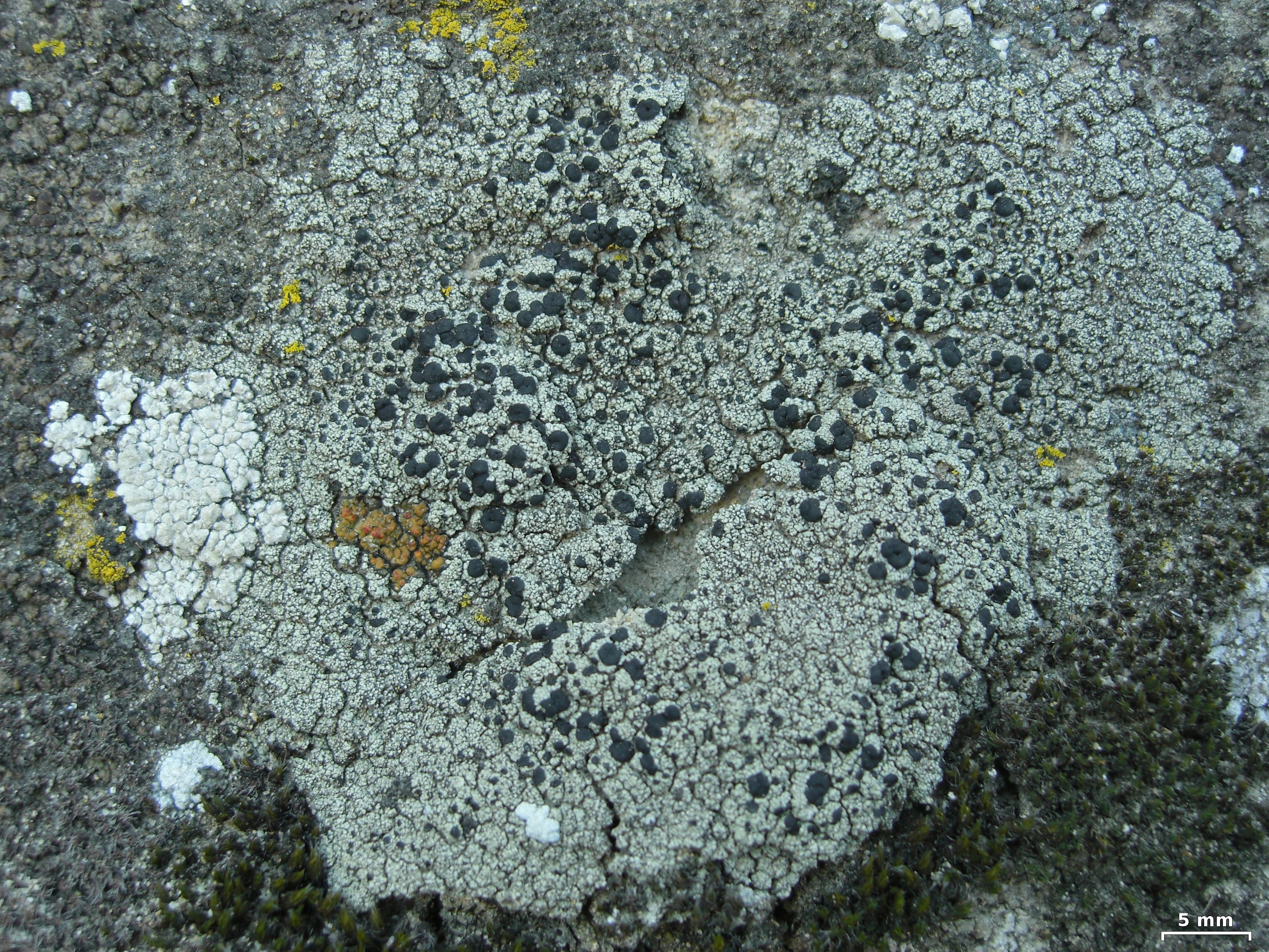
Lecidella asema

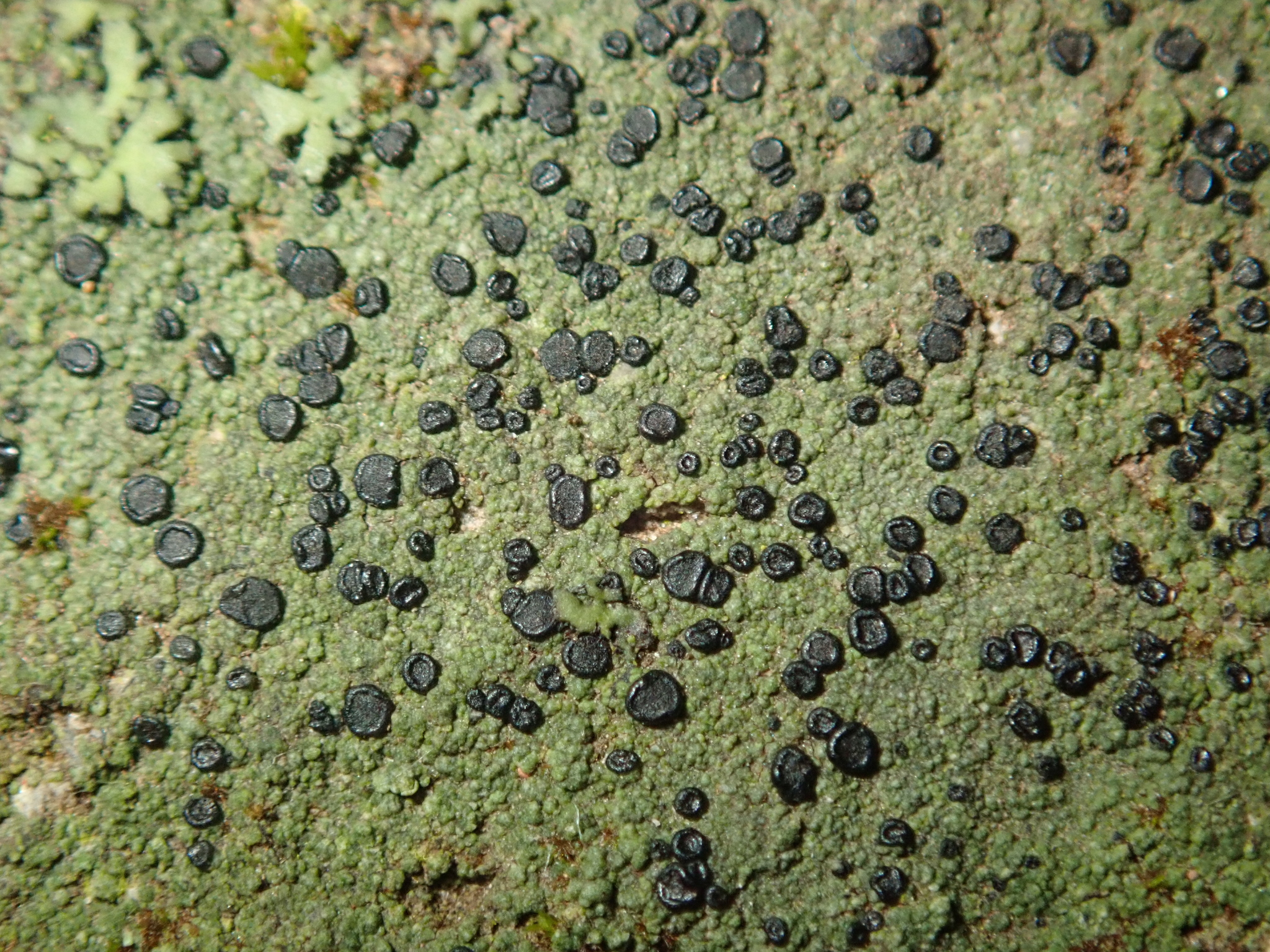
Lecidella stigmatea

- Lecidella aeruginea (H.G.Falk) Knoph & Leuckert (1997)
- Lecidella anomaloides (A.Massal.) Hertel & H.Kilias (1980)
- Lecidella asema (Nyl.) Knoph & Hertel (1990)
- Lecidella aurata Knoph & Leuckert (2000)
- Lecidella buelliastrum (Müll.Arg.) Rambold (1989)
- Lecidella carpathica Körb. (1861)
- Lecidella chiricahuana Knoph & Leuckert (2004)
- Lecidella chodatii (Samp.) Knoph & Leuckert (1990)
- Lecidella conspurcatosorediosa (Harm.) Diederich (1989)
- Lecidella destituta Kantvilas & Elix (2013)
- Lecidella elaeochroma (Ach.) M.Choisy (1950)
- Lecidella enteroleucella (Nyl.) Hertel (1977)
- Lecidella euphorea (Flörke) Kremp. (1861)
- Lecidella flavosorediata (Vězda) Hertel & Leuckert (1969)
- Lecidella flavovirens Kantvilas & Elix (2013)
- Lecidella fuliginea Aptroot & L.A.Santos (2022)
- Lecidella granulosula (Nyl.) Knoph & Leuckert (2000)
- Lecidella greenii U.Rupr. & Türk (2011)
- Lecidella iqbalii Fayyaz, Afshan, Niazi & Khalid (2022)
- Lecidella laureri (Hepp) Körb. (1855)
- Lecidella leucomarginata Kantvilas & Elix (2014) – Australia
- Lecidella mandshurica S.Y.Kondr., Lőkös & Hur (2015) – Asia
- Lecidella meiococca (Nyl.) Leuckert & Hertel (1990)
- Lecidella meridionalis Elix & McCarthy (2018) – Australia
- Lecidella montana Kantvilas & Elix (2013)
- Lecidella nashiana Knoph & Leuckert (2004)
- Lecidella occidentalis Elix & McCarthy (2018)
- Lecidella oceanica Lu L.Zhang & Xin Y.Wang (2012) – South Korea
- Lecidella parasitica Sanderson (1879)
- Lecidella patavina (A.Massal.) Heufl. (1871)
- Lecidella pulveracea (Flot. ex Schaer.) P.Syd. (1887)
- Lecidella scabra (Taylor) Hertel & Leuckert (1969)
- Lecidella stigmatea (Ach.) Hertel & Leuckert (1969)
- Lecidella sublapicida (C.Knight) Hertel (1983)
- Lecidella subviridis Tønsberg (1992) – Norway; Sweden
- Lecidella varangrica Haugan & Tønsberg (2018) – Norway
- Lecidella viridans (Flot.) Körb. (1855)
- Lecidella wulfenii (Ach.) Körb. (1861)
- Lecidella xylogena (Müll.Arg.) Kantvilas & Elix (2013)
- Lecidella yunnanensis Ekanayaka, & K.D.Hyde (2019) – China
