= German Society for Plant Sciences =

Learned society for botany in Germany

Deutsche Botanische Gesellschaft Logo

The German Society for Plant Sciences (also known as German Botanical Society, Deutsche Botanische Gesellschaft, DBG) is a non-profit network for plant sciences and botany in the German-speaking area. It was founded 1882 at Eisenach, Germany. In July 2020 it comprises more than 900 individual members and persons working or interested in plant science. The society supports young scientists and unites all generations.

== Tasks and goals ==
DBG represents plant scientists, promotes plant sciences and scientific botany nationally and internationally. It integrates all plant science disciplines, like plant ecology, plant biochemistry, plant genetics, evolution, plant physiology, morphology and taxonomy and is a non-profit organization.

== Activities ==
Main activities comprise editing scientific articles especially in its scientific journal Plant Biology. This journal is successor of the Botanica Acta (1988 ̶ 1998) and Berichte der Deutschen Botanischen Gesellschaft (1882 ̶1987).

Every other year the society organises an academic conference, the („Botanikertagung“). The conference comprises keynote lectures, oral as well as poster presentations and excursions. Member assemblies also take place during the biannual conference. In the years in-between DBG's Sections (see below) offer workshops and conferences on their fields of expertise.

Since 2014 early career scientists can apply for financial support to organise the so-called Eduard Strasburger Workshop.

== Advancement awards and science prizes ==
To support the next generation of qualified plant scientists DBG awards advancement and science prizes on a regular basis and offers travel allowances to participate in its conferences. DBG also supports conferences in several plant science disciplines to foster participations of early career scientists.

DBG confers the Wilhelm Pfeffer Award for an exceptional PhD thesis, a price for the best plant science paper and the Horst Wiehe Prize for plant science. Since 1994 the Society is involved in the bestowal of the Eduard Strasburger Award for an exceptional and innovative work of a postdoc.

Since 2014 DBG honours the best plant science Master theses of participating universities.

Besides these awards for early career scientists DBG bestows the Simon Schwendener Medal for meritious members who engaged in the society for the profit of all.

== History ==
DBG was founded in September 1882 at Eisenach, Germany, and is among the oldest scientific societies for plant sciences in the world. In 2007 it celebrated its 100th anniversary during its Botanikertagung in Hamburg, Germany, and published a commemorative publication about its history.

== Organs ==
Organs of the DBG are the general assembly, the executive committee and the extended board. Their respective tasks and obligations are laid down in the statutes of this Learned society.

== Integration in and network of other organisations ==
DBG is member of national as well as international umbrella organisations: It is a founding member of the national Verband Biologie, Biowissenschaften und Biomedizin in Deutschland (VBIO). By being a member of the Deutsches Nationalkomitee Biologie (abbreviated DNK, German National Committee of Biology), DBG is internationally networked with the International Union of Biological Sciences. It also is a member of the Federation of European Societies for Plant Biology (FESPB) and associate partner of the European Plant Science Organisation (EPSO).

== Sections ==
DBG contains six Sections for experts in several plant science disciplines. They organise academic conferences and workshops on their own:

- Section Biodiversity and Evolutionary Biology
- Phycology Section
- Section Plant Physiology and Molecular Biology
- Section Applied Botany
- Section Natural Products
- Section for Interactions (former Section Mycology and Lichenology)

Five of the six Section's speakers are extended board members.
