= Forestry Botanical Garden and Arboretum =

Arboretum and botanical garden in Lower Saxony, Germany

Coordinates: 51.5578°N 9.9623°E

The Forstbotanischer Garten und Pflanzengeographisches Arboretum der Universität Göttingen (Forestry Botanical Garden and Phytogeographical Arboretum of the University of Göttingen), often called the Forstbotanischer Garten und Arboretum, is a 40 hectares (99 acres) arboretum and botanical garden maintained by the University of Göttingen. It is located at Büsgenweg 2, Göttingen, Lower Saxony, Germany, immediately adjacent to the New Botanical Garden (Neuer Botanischer Garten der Universität Göttingen), and open to the public daily.

The arboretum dates to 1870 when it was created as a forestry school by the Hannoversch Münden Faculty of Forestry. Over the years it fell into disuse but was revived and substantially modified in 1970/71 when the forestry education and research facilities were transferred to Göttingen. At that time today's garden and arboretum were begun, with first plantings taking place in Autumn 1970 in the Japan section. Early plantings focused on wild species but after 1980 cultivated varieties were increasingly planted.

Today the garden and arboretum contain over 2000 species on the forestry school campus. Its major sections are: geographic collections of trees from China, Japan, Korea, North America, and the Caucasus, which together represent about 45 genera with 800 species, subspecies, and varieties; the forest botanical garden (7 hectares) which contains about 140 plant genera with about 1100 wild species, subspecies, and varieties; and a tertiary forest area.

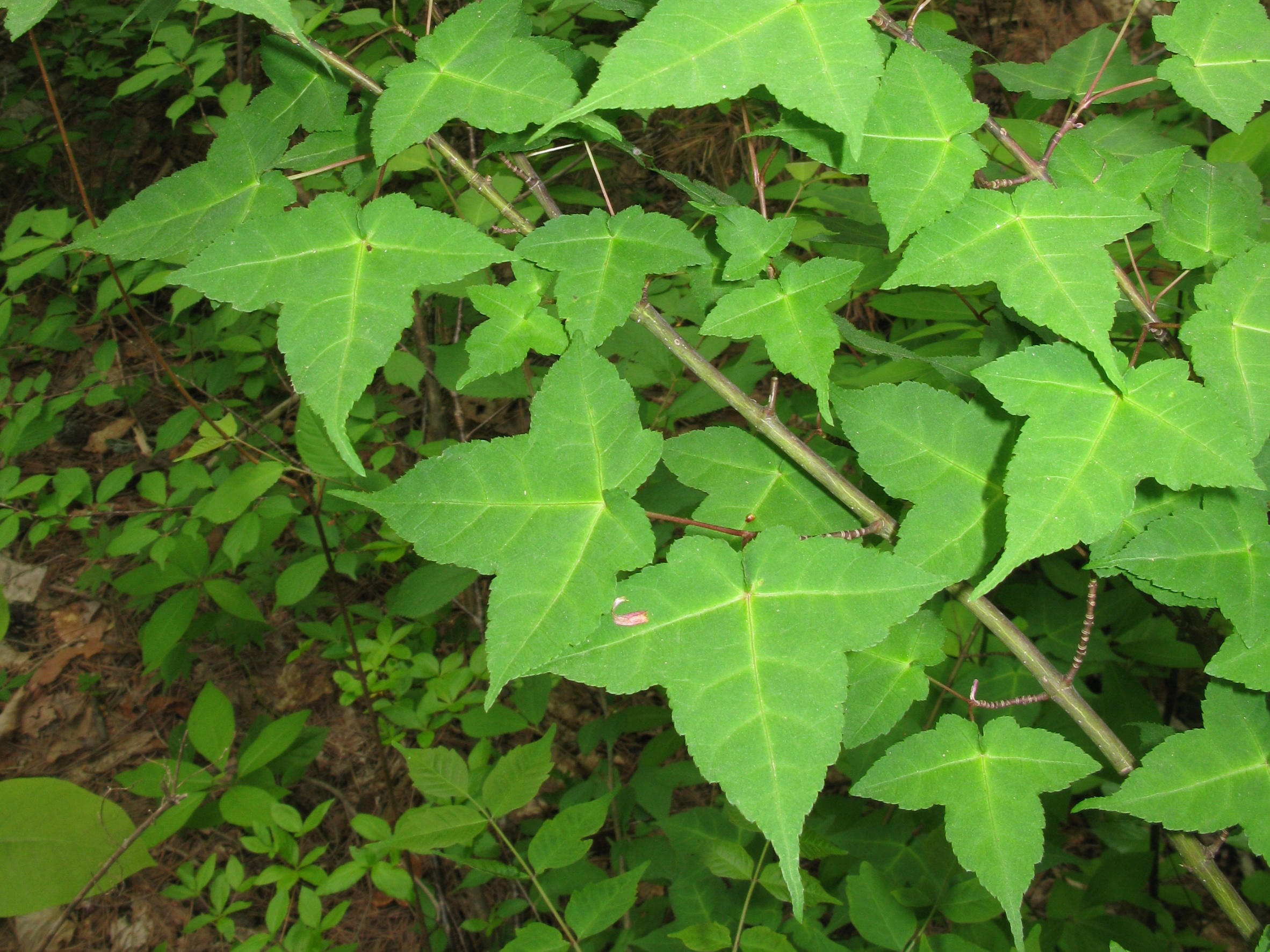
Forestry Botanical Garden and Arboretum

== See also ==
- Alter Botanischer Garten der Universität Göttingen
- Neuer Botanischer Garten der Universität Göttingen
- Forstbotanischer Garten in Hannoversch Münden
- List of botanical gardens in Germany
