= Old Botanical Garden of Göttingen University =

Botanical garden in Göttingen, Germany

Coordinates: 51.5382°N 9.9367°E

Alter Botanischer Garten der Universität Göttingen
- Alter Botanischer Garten Göttingen
- Interactive map of Alter Botanischer Garten der Universität Göttingen
- Type: Botanical garden
- Location: Untere Karspüle 1, Altstadt, Göttingen, Lower Saxony, Germany
- Area: 4.5 hectares
- Founder: Albrecht von Haller (1708–1777)
- Operator: University of Göttingen
- Open: Daily
- Species: ~14,000
- Collections: Bromeliads (~1,500 spp., incl. 500 Tillandsia), Cacti (~1,500 spp.), Ferns (~550 spp.), marsh & aquatic plants (~300 spp.), Mosses (100 spp.), Central European wild plants

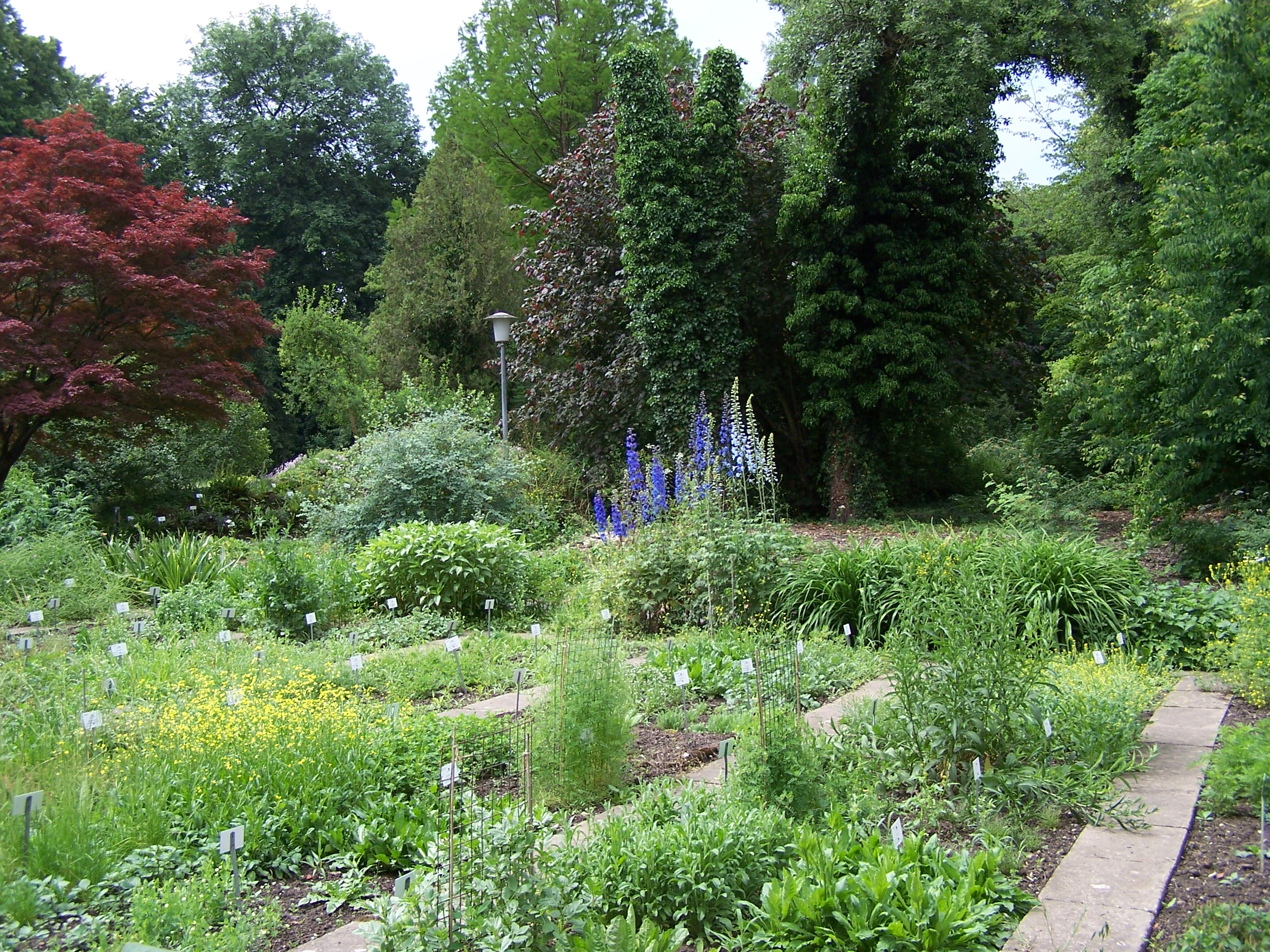
The Old Botanical Garden of Göttingen University

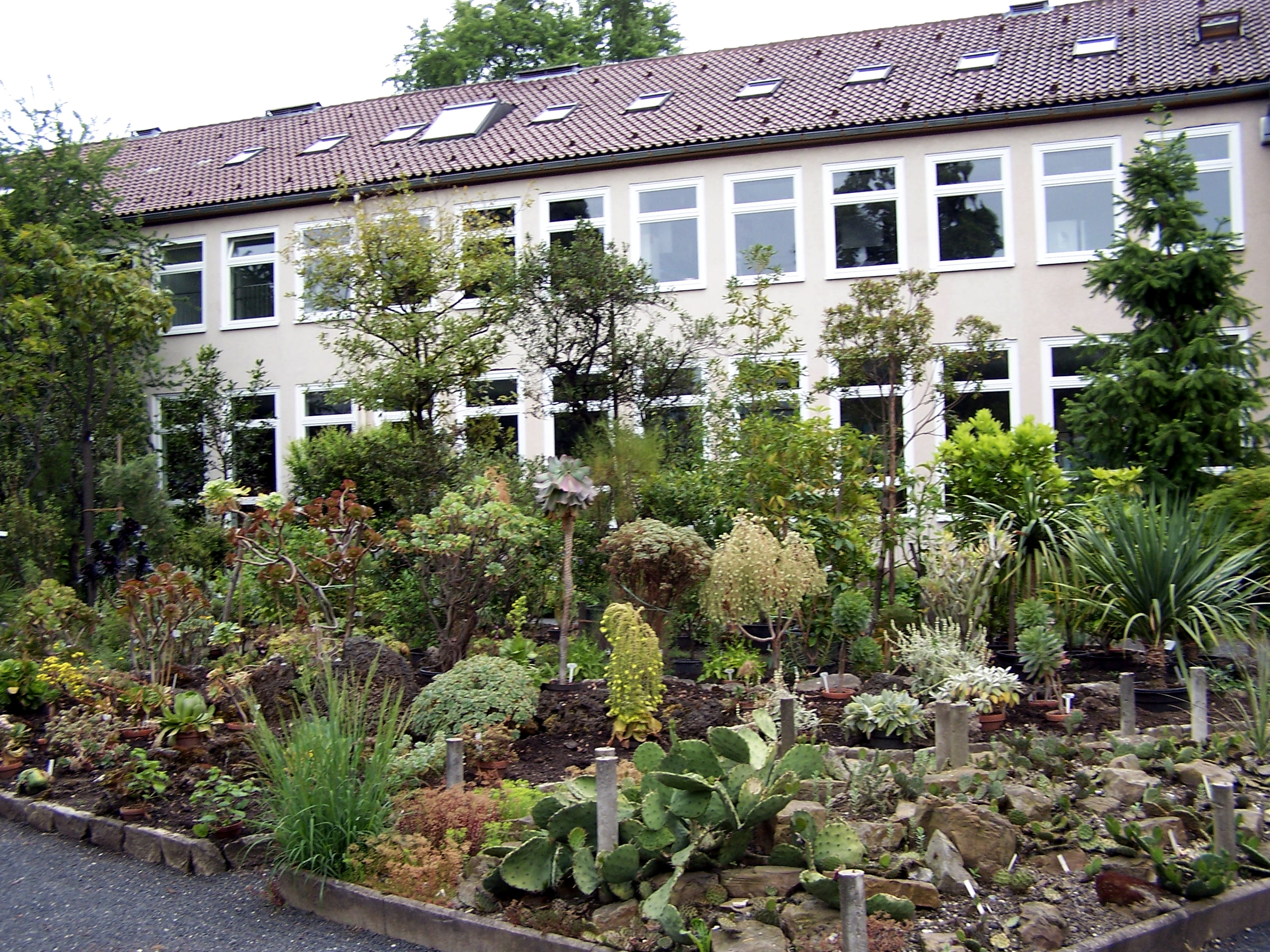
The Old Botanical Garden of Göttingen University

The Old Botanical Garden of Göttingen University (German: Alter Botanischer Garten der Universität Göttingen or Alter Botanischer Garten Göttingen), with an area of 4.5 hectares, is an historic botanical garden maintained by the University of Göttingen. It is located in the Altstadt at Untere Karspüle 1, adjacent to the city wall, Göttingen, Lower Saxony, Germany, and open daily.

The garden was established in 1736 by Albrecht von Haller (1708–1777) as a hortus medicus, and gradually extended via adjacent plots within and without the city wall. By 1806 the garden had a tropical greenhouse, orangery, and cycad house; to these were added in 1830 an Araceae greenhouse, and again in 1857 a new orangery (converted in 1910 to a fern house). Although the garden's collection of tropical plants was destroyed in the World War II, it was replenished postwar and augmented by a major collection of wild plants from central Europe. In 1967, as the university's natural science faculty began its relocation to a site north of the city center, two new botanical gardens were there established (the Neuer Botanischer Garten der Universität Göttingen and the Forstbotanischer Garten und Arboretum), but the old garden continues. In one of the most recent changes, its systematic garden was converted in 2003–2007 from a century-old taxonomic structure to one reflecting contemporary molecular genetics.

Today the garden contains 17,500 accessions representing about 14,000 species, and it forms one of the largest and most significant scientific collections of plants in Germany. It contains major collections of bromeliads (about 1,500 species and varieties, including 500 species of Tillandsia alone), cacti (approximately 1,500 species), ferns (about 550 species, including some of the rarest ferns of Central Europe), marsh and aquatic plants (ca. 300 species), and mosses (100 species). Its major areas include a systemic garden (1,200 species), arboretum, pond, rockery, useful and medicinal plant garden, and a weed collection. Eight greenhouses contain bromeliads, orchids, carnivorous plants, plants of the tropical rain forest, tropical water plants, cycads, aroids, cacti and other succulent plants, and ferns. Three tunnels through the city wall link the garden's inner and outer sections.

== See also ==
- Forstbotanischer Garten und Arboretum
- Neuer Botanischer Garten der Universität Göttingen
- List of botanical gardens in Germany
