= Plant Biology (journal) =

- Discipline: Plant biology
- Language: English
- Edited by: Christiane Werner and Theo Elzenga

Publication details
- Former name(s): Berichte der Deutschen Botanischen Gesellschaft, Botanica Acta
- History: 1880–present
- Publisher: John Wiley & Sons
- Frequency: Bimonthly
- Impact factor: 3.081 (2020)

Standard abbreviations
- ISO 4: Plant Biol. (Stuttg.)

Indexing
- CODEN: PBIOFN
- ISSN: 1435-8603 (print); 1438-8677 (web)
- LCCN: sn99047129
- OCLC no.: 41000240

Links
- Journal homepage; Online access

Plant Biology is a peer-reviewed scientific journal of plant biology. The journal was originally established as Berichte der Deutschen Botanischen Gesellschaft in 1883, changed its name to Botanica Acta in 1988. In 1999, the journal renamed itself Plant Biology, and restarted the volume numbering.

Plant Biology is published by John Wiley & Sons on behalf of the German Society for Plant Sciences and the Royal Botanical Society of the Netherlands. The journal is currently edited by Heinz Rennenberg and J. T. M. Elzenga.

== Abstracting and indexing ==
The journal is abstracted and indexed in the following bibliographic databases:

- Abstracts on Hygiene & Communicable Diseases
- Academic Search
- Academic Search Alumni Edition
- Academic Search Premier
- AgBiotech News & Information
- AgBiotechNet
- Animal Breeding Abstracts
- Biocontrol News & Information
- Biofuels Abstracts
- Biological Abstracts
- BIOSIS Previews
- Botanical Pesticides
- CAB Abstracts
- Crop Physiology Abstracts
- Current Contents/Agriculture, Biology & Environmental Sciences
- Current Contents/Life Sciences
- Dairy Science Abstracts
- Field Crop Abstracts
- Global Health
- Grasslands & Forage Abstracts
- Helminthological Abstracts
- Horticultural Science Abstracts
- Irrigation & Drainage Abstracts
- Journal Citation Reports/Science Edition
- Maize Abstracts
- MEDLINE/PubMed
- Nematological Abstracts
- Ornamental Horticulture
- Plant Breeding Abstracts
- Plant Genetic Resources Abstracts
- Plant Growth Regulator Abstracts
- Postharvest News & Information
- Potato Abstracts
- Poultry Abstracts
- Protozoological Abstracts
- Review of Agricultural Entomology
- Review of Aromatic & Medicinal Plants
- Review of Medical & Veterinary Entomology
- Review of Plant Pathology
- Rice Abstracts
- Science Citation Index
- Science Citation Index Expanded
- Seed Abstracts
- Soils & Fertilizers Abstracts
- Soybean Abstracts Online
- Sugar Industry Abstracts
- Weed Abstracts
- Wheat, Barley & Triticale Abstracts
- Zoological Record

According to the Journal Citation Reports, the journal has a 2020 impact factor of 3.081, ranking it 72nd out of 235 journals in the category "Plant Sciences".
