= Willy Tinner =

Swiss paleoecologist

Willy Tinner (born 18 July 1965) is an Italian-Swiss paleoecologist. He is a professor at the University of Bern and head of the Paleoecology Section at its Institute of Plant Sciences. From 2017 to 2022 he was co-chair of PAGES (Past Global Changes), an international research programme on past environmental change.

His research uses pollen analysis, macrofossil and charcoal analysis, chironomid analysis, sedimentary ancient DNA, and dynamic vegetation modelling to reconstruct interactions among climate, vegetation, and human activity over timescales of years to millennia.

== Education and career ==
Tinner was born in Italy and holds Italian and Swiss citizenship. He completed a Master of Science at the University of Bern in 1993, with a major in geography and minors in botany, geology and archaeology, and a doctorate in 1998 on vegetation and fire dynamics in the southern Alps, supervised by Brigitta Ammann and Marco Conedera. He received his habilitation in geobotany and paleoecology at Bern in 2005.

From 1999 to 2001 he was a postdoctoral researcher at the University of Illinois Urbana-Champaign, working with fire ecologist Feng Sheng Hu. He returned to Bern in 2001, held a SNSF professorship at ETH Zurich in 2007–2008, and was appointed associate professor at Bern in 2011 and full professor in 2018.

In a 2020 article in the Neue Zürcher Zeitung, paleoecologist John Birks described Bern's paleoecology department as a leading international centre. He credited five successive research heads, including Tinner, with decisively advancing the field.

== Research ==
=== Fire ecology and abrupt climate change ===
Tinner's early work examined fire ecology and vegetation history in southern Switzerland. A 1998 study compared charcoal records in lake sediments with documented forest fires in the Ticino region. A 1999 paper in the Journal of Ecology examined long-term forest fire dynamics in the same region, and a 2003 paper with Hu addressed methodology for reconstructing fire history from microscopic charcoal particles.

A 2018 perspective in Fire described the 1998 and 1999 studies as "seminal papers" in the development of charcoal-based paleofire research in the 1990s.

A 2001 study in Geology with André F. Lotter used annually laminated sediments to examine Central European vegetation responses to the abrupt climate event around 8,200 years ago, reporting a vegetation response within decades, including a decline of hazel and expansion of beech and fir. He was a co-author on a 2009 PNAS synthesis using charcoal and pollen records from 35 North American sites to examine wildfire responses to abrupt climate change during the last glacial–interglacial transition, about 15,000–10,000 years ago.

=== European vegetation history ===
Tinner co-edited Quaternary Vegetation Dynamics of Europe (2023) with Gerhard Lang, Brigitta Ammann and Karl-Ernst Behre. The book is an expanded English revision of Lang's 1994 work. Reviewing it in Neilreichia, Wolfgang Willner praised its synthesis of European vegetation history and expected it to become a standard reference. He also noted inconsistencies in terminology and some outdated descriptions of vegetation.

=== EXPLO project ===
In 2018, Tinner co-initiated the EXPLO project (Exploring the Dynamics and Causes of Prehistoric Land Use Change in the Cradle of European Farming), funded by a European Research Council Synergy Grant of €6.4 million. It was the first ERC Synergy Grant awarded to the University of Bern. The project was a collaboration between the University of Bern, the University of Oxford, and the Aristotle University of Thessaloniki, combining underwater archaeology, paleoecology, and computer modelling to study early farming communities in Greece and the southern Balkans over the past 10,000 years. Fieldwork has included sediment coring and excavation at prehistoric settlements on Lake Ohrid and lakes in northern Greece, producing chronologies for Neolithic and Bronze Age sites. The original research plans also included sampling at Lake Prespa.

In 2024, Tinner co-edited the volume Prehistoric Wetland Sites of Southern Europe with Albert Hafner and Ariane Ballmer, published in Springer's Natural Science in Archaeology series.

=== Alpine biodiversity ===
A 2025 study in Nature Communications co-authored by Tinner and members of his research group analysed sedimentary ancient DNA from 14 Alpine lakes covering 603 plant taxa and 11 mammal species over 14,000 years, and reported that the abundance of wild ungulates and cattle was more strongly associated with alpine plant diversity in the late Holocene than temperature was.

=== Research applications ===
A 2026 profile in Pro Natura reported that Tinner's recommendation of silver fir as a replacement for Norway spruce in a warmer climate had been included in European forestry textbooks and other specialist books.

In a 2026 SRF report, Bern's cantonal archaeologist Adriano Boschetti, a long-term collaborator, said that pollen analyses by Tinner's team provided evidence for periods without archaeological finds. At Moossee, evidence of land use around 2700 BC preceded the discovery of wooden piles dated to the same period.

== Editorial and review work ==
Tinner is an associate editor of Vegetation History and Archaeobotany. He has reviewed grant proposals for the US National Science Foundation, the Agence nationale de la recherche, and the Deutsche Forschungsgemeinschaft, among others.

== Public engagement ==
Tinner appeared in the 2024 RSI documentary La mossa del faggio, on the ecological history of the European beech. His group's research on populations of silver fir (Abies alba) in Tuscany and Ticino has been covered in the WSL magazine Diagonal. A 2026 profile in the Pro Natura magazine described his use of pollen records to reconstruct past plant communities. In June 2026, SRF reported on Tinner's use of pollen from lake sediments to reconstruct the history of vegetation and farming around Bern.

== Selected publications ==
- Tinner, W.; Lotter, A.F. (2001). "Central European vegetation response to abrupt climate change at 8.2 ka". Geology. 29 (6): 551–554. Bibcode:2001Geo....29..551T. doi:10.1130/0091-7613(2001)029<0551:CEVRTA>2.0.CO;2. hdl:1874/19634.
- Tinner, W.; Hu, F.S. (2003). "Size parameters, size-class distribution and area-number relationship of microscopic charcoal: relevance for fire reconstruction". The Holocene. 13 (4): 499–505. Bibcode:2003Holoc..13..499T. doi:10.1191/0959683603hl615rp.
- Conedera, M.; Krebs, P.; Tinner, W.; Pradella, M.; Torriani, D. (2004). "The cultivation of Castanea sativa (Mill.) in Europe, from its origin to its diffusion on a continental scale". Vegetation History and Archaeobotany. 13 (3): 161–179. Bibcode:2004VegHA..13..161C. doi:10.1007/s00334-004-0038-7.
- Lang, Gerhard; Ammann, Brigitta; Behre, Karl-Ernst; Tinner, Willy, eds. (2023). Quaternary Vegetation Dynamics of Europe. Bern: Haupt. ISBN 978-3-258-08214-1.
- Ballmer, Ariane; Hafner, Albert; Tinner, Willy, eds. (2024). Prehistoric Wetland Sites of Southern Europe. Natural Science in Archaeology. Springer. doi:10.1007/978-3-031-52780-7.
