= Franz Firbas =

German botanist (1902–1964)

Franz Firbas (born 4 June 1902 in Prague; died 19 February 1964 in Göttingen) was a German botanist who taught at the University of Göttingen. From 1952 to 1964, he was director of its Systematisch-Geobotanisches Institut. Former students include Otto Ludwig Lange, Gerhard Lang and Heinz Ellenberg.

== Education ==
Firbas studied at the German branch of Charles University (German Charles-Ferdinand University) in Prague under Prof. K. Rudolph. He was an assistant professor for a short time, before leaving to go to Germany.
