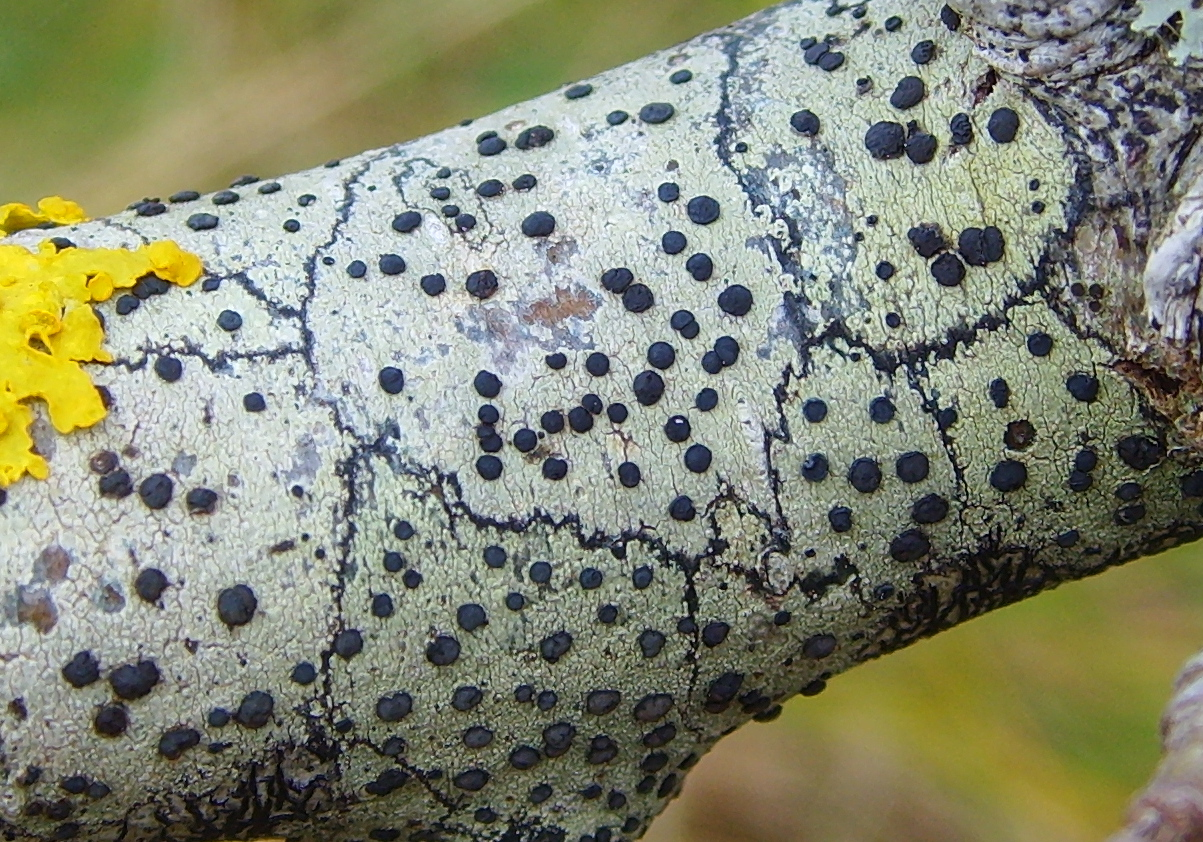

Conservation status
- Secure (NatureServe)

Scientific classification
- Kingdom: Fungi
- Division: Ascomycota
- Class: Lecanoromycetes
- Order: Lecanorales
- Family: Lecanoraceae
- Genus: Lecidella
- Species: L. elaeochroma

Binomial name
- Lecidella elaeochroma (Ach.) M. Choisy, 1950

= Lecidella elaeochroma =

Species of fungus

Lecidella elaeochroma is a species of fungus belonging to the family Lecanoraceae.

It has cosmopolitan distribution.
