= Yoshimuria =

Scientific classification
- Domain: Eukaryota
- Kingdom: Fungi
- Division: Ascomycota
- Class: Lecanoromycetes
- Order: Teloschistales
- Family: Teloschistaceae
- Genus: Yoshimuria; S.Y.Kondr., Kärnefelt, Elix, A.Thell & Hur (2014)

Type species
- Yoshimuria spodoplaca (Nyl.) S.Y.Kondr., Kärnefelt, A.Thell, Elix, J.Kim, A.S.Kondr. & Hur (2014)

Species
- Y. galbina Y. ivanpisutiana Y. seokpoensis Y. spodoplaca

Genus of lichens

Yoshimuria is a genus of lichen-forming fungi in the family Teloschistaceae. It has four species of crustose lichens.

== Taxonomy ==
The genus was circumscribed in 2014 by a group of lichenologists, who assigned Yoshimuria spodoplaca as the type species. Three species were originally included in the genus. The genus name honours the Japanese lichenologist Isao Yoshimura, "for his many contributions to lichenology in Eastern Asia".

Yoshimuria is in the subfamily Caloplacoideae of the family Teloschistaceae.

== Description ==
Yoshimuria is characterised by a crust-like (crustose) thallus, which can vary greatly in thickness from very thin to thick and can be areolate (i.e., divided by cracks into sections called areoles). The colour of the thallus ranges from whitish grey to dark grey or brownish grey. The apothecia of Yoshimuria (fruiting bodies) are either lecanorine (with a thalline margin) or zeorine (without a thalline margin), and are typically sessile (attached directly without a stalk). The disc of these apothecia can be yellow, orange, or dark rust-brown in colour. The true exciple the tissue surrounding the hymenium of the apothecia, is scleroplectenchymatous, meaning it consists of hard, thick-walled cells. The subhymenium, the layer beneath the hymenium, does not contain oil droplets.

The ascospores of Yoshimuria are polarilocular, meaning they have two distinct compartments, with eight spores in each ascus. The conidia, or asexual spores, are broadly bacilliform (rod-shaped). Chemical spot tests reveal that the thallus reacts slightly or not at all (K±) and the apothecia turn purple (K+ purple) when treated with a potassium hydroxide solution. The chemical constituents include anthraquinones, which follow the parietin chemosyndrome, and atranorin in some species.

== Species ==
- Yoshimuria galbina (S.Y.Kondr. & Hur) S.Y.Kondr., Kärnefelt, Elix, A.Thell, Jung Kim, A.S.Kondr. & Hur (2014)
- Yoshimuria ivanpisutiana S.Y.Kondr., Lőkös & Hur (2019)
- Yoshimuria seokpoensis S.Y.Kondr., Lőkös & Hur (2019)
- Yoshimuria spodoplaca (Nyl.) S.Y.Kondr., Kärnefelt, Elix, A.Thell, Jung Kim, A.S.Kondr. & Hur (2014)

Two species once proposed for inclusion in Yoshimuria are now included in other genera:

- Yoshimuria cerussata (Hue) S.Y.Kondr., Kärnefelt, Elix, A.Thell, Jung Kim, A.S.Kondr. & Hur (2014) is now Huea cerussata
- Yoshimuria stipitata (Wetmore) S.Y.Kondr. (2019) is now Gyalolechia stipitata.
