= Comprehensive metabolic panel =

Blood test assessing vital organ health

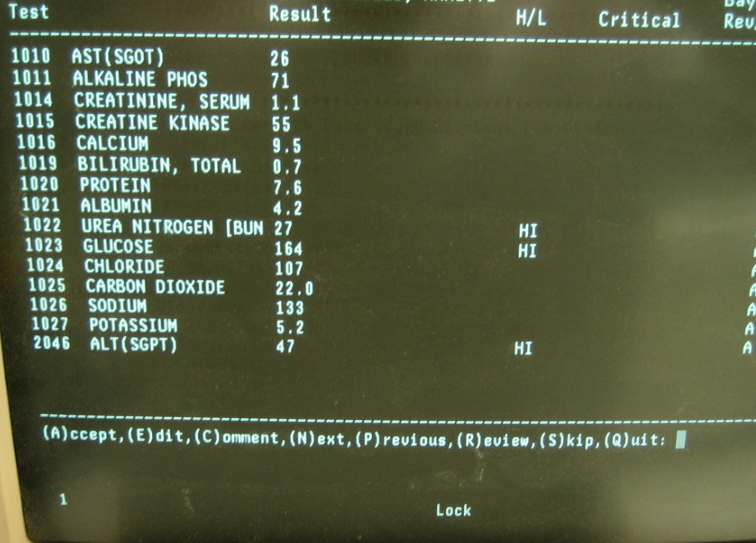
- Computer screen report of a comprehensive metabolic panel.
- MedlinePlus: 003468
- LOINC: 24322-0, 24323-8

The comprehensive metabolic panel, or chemical screen (CMP; CPT code 80053), is a panel of 14 blood tests that serves as an initial broad medical screening tool. The CMP provides a rough check of kidney function, liver function, diabetic and parathyroid status, and electrolyte and fluid balance.

This type of screening has its limitations. Abnormal values from a CMP are often the result of false positives and thus the CMP may need to be repeated (or a more specific test performed), requiring a second blood drawing procedure and possibly additional expense for the patient, even though no disease is present.

The CMP is an expanded version of the basic metabolic panel (BMP), which does not include liver tests. A CMP (or BMP) can be ordered as part of a routine physical examination, or may be used to monitor a patient with a chronic disease, such as diabetes mellitus or hypertension.

Also known as SMA12+2 test, the CMP has previously been known as Chem 12, Chemistry panel, Chemistry screen, SMA 12, SMA 20 and SMAC (Sequential Multiple Analysis - Computer). The tests are performed on machines based on the AutoAnalyzer invented in 1957.

== Testing ==
Pathophysiology sample values
BMP/ELECTROLYTES:
Na^{+} = 140	Cl^{−} = 100	BUN = 20	/ Glu = 150 \
K^{+} = 4	CO_{2} = 22	PCr = 1.0	/ Glu = 150 \
ARTERIAL BLOOD GAS:
HCO_{3}^{−} = 24	p_{a}CO_{2} = 40	p_{a}O_{2} = 95	pH = 7.40
ALVEOLAR GAS:
	p_{A}CO_{2} = 36	p_{A}O_{2} = 105	A-a g = 10
OTHER:
Ca = 9.5	Mg^{2+} = 2.0	PO_{4} = 1
CK = 55	BE = −0.36	AG = 16
SERUM OSMOLARITY/RENAL:
PMO = 300	PCO = 295	POG = 5	BUN:Cr = 20
URINALYSIS:
UNa^{+} = 80	UCl^{−} = 100	UAG = 5	FENa = 0.95
UK^{+} = 25	USG = 1.01	UCr = 60	UO = 800
PROTEIN/GI/LIVER FUNCTION TESTS:
LDH = 100	TP = 7.6	AST = 25	TBIL = 0.7
ALP = 71	Alb = 4.0	ALT = 40	BC = 0.5
		AST/ALT = 0.6	BU = 0.2
AF alb = 3.0	SAAG = 1.0		SOG = 60
CSF:
CSF alb = 30	CSF glu = 60	CSF/S alb = 7.5	CSF/S glu = 0.6

Typically, the patient fasts for ten or twelve hours before the blood is drawn for the test—this is particularly important for getting a useful blood glucose measurement. CMPs are also frequently performed on nonfasting patients, but the glucose level in those cases is not as useful. The following tests are then performed:

=== General tests ===
These tests help screen for a wide variety of problems. The blood glucose test in particular helps screen for diabetes mellitus and pre-diabetes. The calcium test can indicate or monitor bone diseases or diseases of the parathyroid gland or kidneys. Calcium salts, lithium, thiazide diuretics, thyroxine, and vitamin D can all increase levels and may interfere with this test.

- Serum glucose
- Calcium

=== Kidney function assessment ===
- Blood urea nitrogen (BUN)
- Creatinine

=== Electrolytes ===
Electrolyte levels and the balance among them are tightly regulated by the body. Both individual values and ratios among the values are significant; abnormalities among either can indicate problems such as an electrolyte disturbance, acid-base imbalance, or kidney dysfunction.

- Sodium
- Potassium
- Chloride
- Carbon dioxide (CO_{2})

=== Protein tests ===
Tests of protein levels in the blood help screen for both kidney and liver disorders.

- Serum total protein (TP)
- Human serum albumin

=== Liver enzymes ===
- Bilirubin
- Alkaline phosphatase (ALP)
- Aspartate amino transferase (AST or SGOT)
- Alanine amino transferase (ALT or SGPT)

== Results ==
The National Institutes of Health provides ranges considered within normal limits, though optimal levels may vary by individual.

Compare also the ranges given at Reference ranges for blood tests.

Normal CMP Results
Specimen	Normal Range	Units
Albumin	3.9–5.0	g/dL
Alkaline phosphatase	44–147	IU/L
ALT (alanine aminotransferase)	8–37	IU/L
AST (aspartate aminotransferase)	10–34	IU/L
BUN (blood urea nitrogen)	7–20	mg/dL
Calcium	8.5–10.9	mg/dL
Chloride	96–106	mmol/L
CO2 (carbon dioxide)	20–29	mmol/L
Creatinine	0.6–1.1 (women) 0.7–1.3 (men)	mg/dL
Glucose	70–100	mg/dL
Potassium	3.7–5.2	mEq/L
Sodium	136–144	mEq/L
Total bilirubin	0.2–1.9	mg/dL
Total protein	6.3–7.9	g/dL

== See also ==
- Basic metabolic panel
