= Anion gap =

Difference in quantities of cations and anions in blood or urine

Pathophysiology sample values
BMP/ELECTROLYTES:
Na^{+} = 140	Cl^{−} = 100	BUN = 20	/ Glu = 150 \
K^{+} = 4	CO_{2} = 22	PCr = 1.0	/ Glu = 150 \
ARTERIAL BLOOD GAS:
HCO_{3}^{−} = 24	p_{a}CO_{2} = 40	p_{a}O_{2} = 95	pH = 7.40
ALVEOLAR GAS:
	p_{A}CO_{2} = 36	p_{A}O_{2} = 105	A-a g = 10
OTHER:
Ca = 9.5	Mg^{2+} = 2.0	PO_{4} = 1
CK = 55	BE = −0.36	AG = 16
SERUM OSMOLARITY/RENAL:
PMO = 300	PCO = 295	POG = 5	BUN:Cr = 20
URINALYSIS:
UNa^{+} = 80	UCl^{−} = 100	UAG = 5	FENa = 0.95
UK^{+} = 25	USG = 1.01	UCr = 60	UO = 800
PROTEIN/GI/LIVER FUNCTION TESTS:
LDH = 100	TP = 7.6	AST = 25	TBIL = 0.7
ALP = 71	Alb = 4.0	ALT = 40	BC = 0.5
		AST/ALT = 0.6	BU = 0.2
AF alb = 3.0	SAAG = 1.0		SOG = 60
CSF:
CSF alb = 30	CSF glu = 60	CSF/S alb = 7.5	CSF/S glu = 0.6

The anion gap (AG or AGAP) is a value calculated from the results of multiple individual medical lab tests. It may be reported with the results of an electrolyte panel, which is often performed as part of a comprehensive metabolic panel.

The anion gap is the quantity difference between cations (positively charged ions) and anions (negatively charged ions) in serum, plasma, or urine. The magnitude of this difference (i.e., "gap") in the serum is calculated to identify metabolic acidosis. If the gap is greater than normal, then high anion gap metabolic acidosis is diagnosed.

The term "anion gap" usually implies "serum anion gap", but the urine anion gap is also a clinically useful measure.

== Calculation ==
The anion gap is a calculated measure. It is computed with a formula that uses the results of several individual lab tests, each of which measures the concentration of a specific anion or cation.

The concentrations are expressed in units of milliequivalents/liter (mEq/L) or in millimoles/litre (mmol/L).

=== With potassium ===
The anion gap is calculated by subtracting the serum concentrations of chloride and bicarbonate (anions) from the concentrations of sodium and potassium (cations):

= ([Na^{+}] + [K^{+}]) − ([Cl^{−}] + [HCO^{−}_{3}]) = 20 mEq/L

=== Without potassium ===
Because potassium concentrations are very low, they usually have little effect on the calculated gap. Therefore, omission of potassium has become widely accepted. This leaves the following equation:

= [Na^{+}] - ([Cl^{−}] + [HCO^{−}_{3}])

Normal AG = 8-16 mEq/L

Expressed in words, the equation is:

Anion Gap = sodium - (chloride + bicarbonate)

which is logically equivalent to:

Anion Gap = (the most prevalent cation) minus (the sum of the most prevalent anions)

(Bicarbonate may also be referred to as "total CO_{2}" or "carbon dioxide".)

== Uses ==
Calculating the anion gap is clinically useful because it helps in the differential diagnosis of a number of disease states. More specifically, it helps detect acid–base imbalances. It also serves as an error check for electrolyte measurements and detects paraproteins.

The total number of cations (positive ions) should be equal to the total number of anions (negative ions), so that the overall electrical charge is neutral. However, routine tests do not measure all types of ions. The anion gap is representative of how many ions are not accounted for by the lab measurements used in the calculation. These "unmeasured" ions are mostly anions, which is why the value is called the "anion gap."

By definition, only the cations sodium (Na^{+}) and potassium (K^{+}) and the anions chloride (Cl^{−}) and bicarbonate (HCO^{−}_{3}) are used to calculate the anion gap. (As discussed above, potassium may or may not be used, depending on the specific lab.)

The cations calcium (Ca^{2+}) and magnesium (Mg^{2+}) are also commonly measured, but they aren't used to calculate the anion gap. Anions that are generally considered "unmeasured" include a few normally occurring serum proteins, and some pathological proteins (e.g., paraproteins found in multiple myeloma).

Similarly, tests do often measure the anion phosphate (PO^{3−}_{4}) specifically, but it isn't used to calculate that "gap," even if it is measured. Commonly 'unmeasured' anions include sulfates and a number of serum proteins.

In normal health there are more measurable cations than measurable anions in the serum; therefore, the anion gap is usually positive. Because we know that plasma is electro-neutral (uncharged), we can conclude that the anion gap calculation represents the concentration of unmeasured anions. The anion gap varies in response to changes in the concentrations of the above-mentioned serum components that contribute to the acid-base balance.

== Normal value ranges ==
Different labs use different formulas and procedures to calculate the anion gap, so the reference range (or "normal" range) from one lab isn't directly interchangeable with the range from another. The reference range provided by the particular lab that performed the testing should always be used to interpret the results. Also, some healthy people may have values outside of the "normal" range provided by any lab.

Modern analyzers use ion-selective electrodes which give a normal anion gap as <11 mEq/L. Therefore, according to the new classification system, a high anion gap is anything above 11 mEq/L. A normal anion gap is often defined as being within the prediction interval of 3–11 mEq/L, with an average estimated at 6 mEq/L.

In the past, methods for the measurement of the anion gap consisted of colorimetry for [HCO^{−}_{3}] and [Cl^{−}] as well as flame photometry for [Na^{+}] and [K^{+}]. Thus normal reference values ranged from 8 to 16 mEq/L plasma when not including [K^{+}] and from 10 to 20 mEq/L plasma when including [K^{+}]. Some specific sources use 15 and 8–16 mEq/L.

== Interpretation and causes ==
Anion gap can be classified as either high, normal or, in rare cases, low. Laboratory errors need to be ruled out whenever anion gap calculations lead to results that do not fit the clinical picture. Methods used to determine the concentrations of some of the ions used to calculate the anion gap may be susceptible to very specific errors. For example, if the blood sample is not processed immediately after it is collected, continued cellular metabolism by leukocytes (also known as white blood cells) may result in an increase in the HCO^{−}_{3} concentration, and result in a corresponding mild reduction in the anion gap. In many situations, alterations in renal function (even if mild, e.g., as that caused by dehydration in a patient with diarrhea) may modify the anion gap that may be expected to arise in a particular pathological condition.

A high anion gap indicates increased concentrations of unmeasured anions by proxy. Elevated concentrations of unmeasured anions like lactate, beta-hydroxybutyrate, acetoacetate, PO^{3−}_{4}, and SO^{2−}_{4}, which rise with disease or intoxication, cause loss of HCO^{−}_{3} due to bicarbonate's activity as a buffer (without a concurrent increase in Cl^{−}). Thus, finding a high anion gap should result in a search for conditions that lead to excesses of the unmeasured anions listed above.

=== High anion gap ===
The anion gap is affected by changes in unmeasured ions. In uncontrolled diabetes, there is an increase in ketoacids due to metabolism of ketones. Raised levels of acid bind to bicarbonate to form carbon dioxide through the Henderson-Hasselbalch equation resulting in metabolic acidosis. In these conditions, bicarbonate concentrations decrease by acting as a buffer against the increased presence of acids (as a result of the underlying condition). The bicarbonate is consumed by the unmeasured cation(H+) (via its action as a buffer) resulting in a high anion gap.

Causes of high anion gap metabolic acidosis (HAGMA):

- Lactic acidosis
- Ketoacidosis
  - Diabetic ketoacidosis
  - Hazardous alcohol use
- Toxicants:
  - Methanol
  - Ethylene glycol
  - Propylene glycol
  - Lactic acid
  - Uremia
  - Aspirin
  - Phenformin (no longer on market in U.S. since 1978 due to severe lactic acidosis, but still a problem globally. "Old metformin")
  - Iron
  - Isoniazid
  - Cyanide, coupled with elevated venous oxygenation
- Kidney failure, causes high anion gap acidosis by decreased acid excretion and decreased HCO^{−}_{3} reabsorption. Accumulation of sulfates, phosphates, urate, and hippurate accounts for the high anion gap.

Note: a useful mnemonic to remember this is MUDPILES – Methanol, Uremia, Diabetic Ketoacidosis, Paraldehyde, Infection, Lactic Acidosis, Ethylene Glycol and Salicylates

=== Normal anion gap ===
In patients with a normal anion gap, the drop in HCO^{−}_{3} is the primary pathology. Since there is only one other major buffering anion, it must be compensated for almost completely by an increase in Cl^{−}. This is therefore also known as hyperchloremic acidosis.

The HCO^{−}_{3} lost is replaced by a chloride anion, and thus there is a normal anion gap.

- Gastrointestinal loss of HCO^{−}_{3} (i.e., diarrhea) (note: vomiting causes hypochloraemic alkalosis)
- Kidney loss of HCO^{−}_{3} (i.e., proximal renal tubular acidosis (RTA) also known as type 2 RTA)
- Kidney dysfunction (i.e., distal renal tubular acidosis also known as type 1 RTA)
- Renal hypoaldosterone (i.e., renal tubular acidosis also known as type IV RTA) characterized by elevated serum potassium.

There are three types.
1. Low renin may be due to diabetic nephropathy or NSAIDS (and other causes).
2. Low aldosterone may be due to adrenal disorders or ACE inhibitors.
3. Low response to aldosterone maybe due to potassium-sparing diuretics, trimethoprim/sulfamethoxazole, or diabetes (and other causes).

- Ingestions
  - Ammonium chloride and acetazolamide, ifosfamide.
  - Hyperalimentation fluids (i.e., total parenteral nutrition)
- Some cases of ketoacidosis, particularly during rehydration with sodium-containing solutions (IV).
- Alcohols (such as ethanol) can cause a high anion gap acidosis in some patients, but a mixed picture in others due to concurrent metabolic alkalosis.
- Mineralocorticoid deficiency (Addison's disease)

A sometimes used mnemonic to remember this is FUSEDCARS – fistula (pancreatic), uretero-enterostomy, saline administration, endocrine (hyperparathyroidism), diarrhea, carbonic anhydrase inhibitors (acetazolamide), ammonium chloride, renal tubular acidosis, spironolactone.

=== Low anion gap ===
A low anion gap is often due to hypoalbuminemia. Albumin is an anionic protein and its loss results in the retention of other negatively charged ions such as chloride and bicarbonate. As bicarbonate and chloride anions are used to calculate the anion gap, there is a subsequent decrease.

The anion gap is sometimes reduced in multiple myeloma, where there is an increase in plasma IgG (paraproteinaemia).

== Correcting the anion gap for the albumin concentration ==
The calculated value of the anion gap should always be adjusted for variations in the serum albumin concentration. For example, in cases of hypoalbuminemia the calculated value of the anion gap should be increased by 2.3 to 2.5 mEq/L per each 1 g/dL decrease in serum albumin concentration (refer to Sample calculations, below). Common conditions that reduce serum albumin in the clinical setting are hemorrhage, nephrotic syndrome, intestinal obstruction and liver cirrhosis. Hypoalbuminemia is common in critically ill patients.

The anion gap is often employed as a simple scanning tool by clinicians at the bedside to detect the presence of anions such as lactate, which can accumulate in critically ill patients. Hypoalbuminemia can mask a mild elevation of the anion gap, resulting in failure to detect an accumulation of unmeasured anions. In the largest study published to date, featuring over 12,000 data sets, Figge, Bellomo and Egi demonstrated that the anion gap, when used to detect critical levels of lactate (greater than 4 mEq/L), exhibited a sensitivity of only 70.4%. In contrast, the albumin-corrected anion gap demonstrated a sensitivity of 93.0%. Therefore, it is important to correct the calculated value of the anion gap for the concentration of albumin, particularly in critically ill patients. Corrections can be made for the albumin concentration using the Figge-Jabor-Kazda-Fencl equation to give an accurate anion gap calculation as exemplified below.

=== Sample calculations ===
Given the following data from a patient with severe hypoalbuminemia suffering from postoperative multiple organ failure, calculate the anion gap and the albumin-corrected anion gap.

Data:

- [Na^{+}] = 137 mEq/L;
- [Cl^{−}] = 102 mEq/L;
- [HCO^{−}_{3}] = 24 mEq/L;
- [Normal Albumin] = 4.4 g/dL;
- [Observed Albumin] = 0.6 g/dL.

Calculations:

- Anion Gap = [Na^{+}] - ([Cl^{−}] + [HCO^{−}_{3}]) = 137 - (102 + 24) = 11 mEq/L.
- Albumin-Corrected Anion Gap = Anion Gap + 2.5 x ([Normal Albumin] - [Observed Albumin]) = 11 + 2.5 x (4.4 - 0.6) = 20.5 mEq/L.

In this example, the albumin-corrected anion gap reveals the presence of a significant quantity of unmeasured anions.

== See also ==
- Osmol gap
- Delta ratio
