= Basic metabolic panel =

Blood test

- MedlinePlus: 003462
- LOINC: 24320-4, 24321-2, 51990-0

A basic metabolic panel (BMP) is a blood test consisting of a set of seven or eight biochemical tests and is one of the most common lab tests ordered by health care providers. Outside the United States, blood tests made up of the majority of the same biochemical tests are called urea and electrolytes (U&E or "U and Es"), or urea, electrolytes, creatinine (UEC or EUC or CUE), and are often referred to as 'kidney function tests' as they also include a calculated estimated glomerular filtration rate. The BMP provides key information regarding fluid and electrolyte status, kidney function, blood sugar levels, and response to various medications and other medical therapies. It is frequently employed as a screening tool during a physical exam.

The basic metabolic panel is a simpler version of the comprehensive metabolic panel (CMP), which includes tests for liver function.

== Components ==
The version with seven tests is often referred to by medical professionals in the United States as the "CHEM-7", or "SMA-7" (Sequential Multiple Analysis-7).

The seven parts of a CHEM-7 are tests for:

- Four electrolytes:
  - sodium (Na^{+})
  - potassium (K^{+})
  - chloride (Cl^{−})
  - bicarbonate (HCO_{3}^{−}) or CO_{2}
- blood urea (BU), blood urea nitrogen in the U.S.
- creatinine
- glucose

These levels, taken as a set, can be rapidly performed to indicate several common acute conditions requiring immediate specific medical treatment, such as dehydration/hypovolemia, water intoxication (which can present with similar symptoms to dehydration but requires the opposite treatment), diabetic shock (either ketoacidosis, hyperglycemia or hypoglycemia), congestive heart failure, kidney failure or liver failure, various substance overdoses or adverse reactions, and others. A Chem-7 is thus a vital tool when attempting to stabilize a patient.

Calcium (Ca^{2+}) is often considered part of the BMP, though, by definition, it is not part of the CHEM-7. A basic metabolic panel including calcium is sometimes colloquially referred to as a "CHEM-8". Calcium, as an alkaline earth metal, is also an electrolyte, but abnormalities are more commonly associated with malnutrition, osteoporosis, or malignancy, especially of the thyroid.

In countries that do not use the CHEM-7 panel, a UEC typically does not include glucose but will often include an estimated glomerular filtration rate (eGFR).

== Reporting ==
Pathophysiology sample values
BMP/ELECTROLYTES:
Na^{+} = 140	Cl^{−} = 100	BUN = 20	/ Glu = 150 \
K^{+} = 4	CO_{2} = 22	PCr = 1.0	/ Glu = 150 \
ARTERIAL BLOOD GAS:
HCO_{3}^{−} = 24	p_{a}CO_{2} = 40	p_{a}O_{2} = 95	pH = 7.40
ALVEOLAR GAS:
	p_{A}CO_{2} = 36	p_{A}O_{2} = 105	A-a g = 10
OTHER:
Ca = 9.5	Mg^{2+} = 2.0	PO_{4} = 1
CK = 55	BE = −0.36	AG = 16
SERUM OSMOLARITY/RENAL:
PMO = 300	PCO = 295	POG = 5	BUN:Cr = 20
URINALYSIS:
UNa^{+} = 80	UCl^{−} = 100	UAG = 5	FENa = 0.95
UK^{+} = 25	USG = 1.01	UCr = 60	UO = 800
PROTEIN/GI/LIVER FUNCTION TESTS:
LDH = 100	TP = 7.6	AST = 25	TBIL = 0.7
ALP = 71	Alb = 4.0	ALT = 40	BC = 0.5
		AST/ALT = 0.6	BU = 0.2
AF alb = 3.0	SAAG = 1.0		SOG = 60
CSF:
CSF alb = 30	CSF glu = 60	CSF/S alb = 7.5	CSF/S glu = 0.6

The results of a basic metabolic panel are traditionally represented in a standard grid:

Na^{+}	Cl^{−}	BUN
K^{+}	HCO_{3}	creatinine

Glucose (and sometimes calcium, magnesium, and phosphorus) are listed to the right of this grid, but there is greater variation in how these values are reported.

== See also ==
- Comprehensive metabolic panel
