= AST/ALT ratio =

Ratio used in biochemistry

- LOINC: 16325-3, 1916-6

The AST/ALT ratio or De Ritis ratio is the ratio between the concentrations of two enzymes, aspartate transaminase (AST) and alanine transaminase, a.k.a. alanine aminotransferase (ALT), in the blood of a human or animal. It is used as one of several liver function tests, and measured with a blood test. It is sometimes useful in medical diagnosis for elevated transaminases to differentiate between causes of liver damage, or hepatotoxicity.

Most causes of liver cell injury are associated with a greater increase in ALT than AST, but an AST/ALT ratio of 2:1 or greater is suggestive of alcoholic liver disease, particularly in the setting of an elevated gamma-glutamyl transferase.

The AST/ALT ratio can also occasionally be elevated in a liver disease pattern in patients with nonalcoholic steatohepatitis, and it is frequently elevated in an alcoholic liver disease pattern in patients with hepatitis C who have developed cirrhosis. In addition, patients with Wilson's disease or cirrhosis due to viral hepatitis may have an AST that is greater than the ALT, though the ratio typically is not greater than two.

When the AST is higher than ALT, a muscle source of these enzymes should be considered. For example, muscle inflammation due to dermatomyositis may cause AST > ALT. This is a good reminder that AST and ALT are not good measures of liver function when other sources may influence AST and/or ALT, because they do not reliably reflect the synthesizing ability of the liver, and they may come from tissues other than liver (such as muscle). For example, intense exercise such as weightlifting can increase ALT to 50–200 U/L, and AST to 100–1000 U/L (and raise AST to about four times ALT) for the week following the exercise.

== History ==
Pathophysiology sample values
BMP/ELECTROLYTES:
Na^{+} = 140	Cl^{−} = 100	BUN = 20	/ Glu = 150 \
K^{+} = 4	CO_{2} = 22	PCr = 1.0	/ Glu = 150 \
ARTERIAL BLOOD GAS:
HCO_{3}^{−} = 24	p_{a}CO_{2} = 40	p_{a}O_{2} = 95	pH = 7.40
ALVEOLAR GAS:
	p_{A}CO_{2} = 36	p_{A}O_{2} = 105	A-a g = 10
OTHER:
Ca = 9.5	Mg^{2+} = 2.0	PO_{4} = 1
CK = 55	BE = −0.36	AG = 16
SERUM OSMOLARITY/RENAL:
PMO = 300	PCO = 295	POG = 5	BUN:Cr = 20
URINALYSIS:
UNa^{+} = 80	UCl^{−} = 100	UAG = 5	FENa = 0.95
UK^{+} = 25	USG = 1.01	UCr = 60	UO = 800
PROTEIN/GI/LIVER FUNCTION TESTS:
LDH = 100	TP = 7.6	AST = 25	TBIL = 0.7
ALP = 71	Alb = 4.0	ALT = 40	BC = 0.5
		AST/ALT = 0.6	BU = 0.2
AF alb = 3.0	SAAG = 1.0		SOG = 60
CSF:
CSF alb = 30	CSF glu = 60	CSF/S alb = 7.5	CSF/S glu = 0.6

The De Ritis ratio is named after Fernando De Ritis, who performed analysis on transaminases in 1957.

== Mechanism ==
AST/ALT ratio	Associated conditions
>5	extrahepatic causes
>2	alcoholic hepatitis
>2	hepatocellular carcinoma
>2	early-stage viral hepatitis
<1	late-stage viral hepatitis

The proportion of AST to ALT in hepatocytes is about 2.5:1, but because AST is removed from serum by the liver sinusoidal cells twice as quickly (serum half-life t_{1/2} = 18 hr) compared to ALT (t_{1/2} = 36 hr), so the resulting serum levels of AST and ALT are about equal in healthy individuals, resulting in a normal AST/ALT ratio around 1.

An AST/ALT ratio >5 necessarily involves extrahepatic tissue, as death of hepatocytes alone would produce an AST/ALT ratio no greater than 2.5. Because the primary cause is extrahepatic, typically an isolated elevated AST is seen, with no change in ALT. Common causes include bone disease, chronic renal failure, lymphoma, and congestive heart failure.

When hepatocellular death is increased beyond the usual "background" levels, the serum levels of AST compared to ALT tend to reflect the cellular proportions, yielding AST that is over twice as prevalent as ALT (AST/ALT >2) in conditions with chronic, constant hepatocyte damage (such as alcoholic hepatitis, hepatocellular carcinoma) and during early-stage acute liver damage (such as viral hepatitis).

In late-stage acute liver damage, the body has had adequate time to clear AST, but not ALT, often resulting in an AST/ALT <1. Since testing typically occurs late in acute viral hepatitis, it is conventionally associated with an AST/ALT ratio <1, though early in the disease, the AST/ALT ratio is often elevated. As the acute liver damage resolves, the body has more time to clear ALT, so in the absence of chronic liver disease, the AST/ALT ratio gradually returns to baseline levels.

== See also ==
- Liver function tests
- Elevated transaminases
