= Pathophysiology =

Convergence of pathology with physiology

Pathophysiology sample values
BMP/ELECTROLYTES:
Na^{+} = 140	Cl^{−} = 100	BUN = 20	/ Glu = 150 \
K^{+} = 4	CO_{2} = 22	PCr = 1.0	/ Glu = 150 \
ARTERIAL BLOOD GAS:
HCO_{3}^{−} = 24	p_{a}CO_{2} = 40	p_{a}O_{2} = 95	pH = 7.40
ALVEOLAR GAS:
	p_{A}CO_{2} = 36	p_{A}O_{2} = 105	A-a g = 10
OTHER:
Ca = 9.5	Mg^{2+} = 2.0	PO_{4} = 1
CK = 55	BE = −0.36	AG = 16
SERUM OSMOLARITY/RENAL:
PMO = 300	PCO = 295	POG = 5	BUN:Cr = 20
URINALYSIS:
UNa^{+} = 80	UCl^{−} = 100	UAG = 5	FENa = 0.95
UK^{+} = 25	USG = 1.01	UCr = 60	UO = 800
PROTEIN/GI/LIVER FUNCTION TESTS:
LDH = 100	TP = 7.6	AST = 25	TBIL = 0.7
ALP = 71	Alb = 4.0	ALT = 40	BC = 0.5
		AST/ALT = 0.6	BU = 0.2
AF alb = 3.0	SAAG = 1.0		SOG = 60
CSF:
CSF alb = 30	CSF glu = 60	CSF/S alb = 7.5	CSF/S glu = 0.6

Pathophysiology (or physiopathology) is a branch of study, at the intersection of pathology and physiology, concerning disordered physiological processes that cause, result from, or are otherwise associated with a disease or injury. Pathology is the medical discipline that describes conditions typically observed during a disease state, whereas physiology is the biological discipline that describes processes or mechanisms operating within an organism. Pathology describes the abnormal or undesired condition (symptoms of a disease), whereas pathophysiology seeks to explain the functional changes that are occurring within an individual due to a disease or pathologic state.

== Etymology ==
The term pathophysiology comes from the Ancient Greek πάθος (pathos) and φυσιολογία (phisiologia).

== History ==
=== Early Developments ===
The origins of pathophysiology as a distinct field date back to the late 18th century. The first known lectures on the subject were delivered by Professor August Friedrich Hecker at the University of Erfurt in 1790, and in 1791, he published the first textbook on pathophysiology, Grundriss der Physiologia pathologica, spanning 770 pages. Hecker also established the first academic journal in the field, Magazin für die pathologische Anatomie und Physiologie, in 1796. The French physician Jean François Fernel had earlier suggested in 1542 that a distinct branch of physiology should study the functions of diseased organisms, an idea further developed by Jean Varandal in 1617, who first coined the term "pathologic physiology" in a medical text.

=== Nineteenth century ===
==== Reductionism ====
In Germany in the 1830s, Johannes Peter Müller led the establishment of physiology research as autonomous from medical research. In 1843, the Berlin Physical Society was founded in part to purge biology and medicine of vitalism, and in 1847, Hermann von Helmholtz, who joined the Society in 1845, published the paper "On the conservation of energy", highly influential in reducing physiology's research foundation to physical sciences. In the late 1850s, German anatomical pathologist Rudolf Virchow, a former student of Müller, directed focus to the cell, establishing cytology as the focus of physiological research. He also recognized pathophysiology as a distinct discipline, arguing that it should rely on clinical observation and experimentation rather than purely anatomical pathology. Virchow’s influence extended to his student Julius Cohnheim, who pioneered experimental pathology and the usage of intravital microscopy, further advancing the study of pathophysiology.

==== Germ theory ====
By 1863, motivated by Louis Pasteur's report on fermentation to butyric acid, fellow Frenchman Casimir Davaine identified a microorganism as the crucial causal agent of the cattle disease anthrax, but its routinely vanishing from blood left other scientists inferring it a mere byproduct of putrefaction. In 1876, upon Ferdinand Cohn's report of a tiny spore stage of a bacterial species, the fellow German Robert Koch isolated Davaine's bacterides in pure culture—a pivotal step that would establish bacteriology as a distinct discipline—identified a spore stage, applied Jakob Henle's postulates, and confirmed Davaine's conclusion, a major feat for experimental pathology. Pasteur and colleagues followed up with ecological investigations confirming its role in the natural environment via spores in soil.

Also, as to sepsis, Davaine had injected rabbits with a highly diluted, tiny amount of putrid blood, duplicated disease, and used the term ferment of putrefaction, but it was unclear whether this referred as did Pasteur's term ferment to a microorganism or, as it did for many others, to a chemical. In 1878, Koch published Aetiology of Traumatic Infective Diseases—unlike any previous work—in which, in 80 pages, Koch, as noted by a historian, "was able to show, in a manner practically conclusive, that a number of diseases, differing clinically, anatomically, and in aetiology, can be produced experimentally by the injection of putrid materials into animals." Koch used bacteriology and the new staining methods with aniline dyes to identify particular microorganisms for each. Germ theory of disease crystallized the concept of "cause" as presumably identifiable by scientific investigation.

==== Scientific medicine ====
The American physician William Henry Welch trained in German pathology from 1876 to 1878, including under Julius Cohnheim, and opened America's first scientific laboratory—a pathology laboratory—at Bellevue Hospital in New York City in 1878. Welch's course drew enrollment from students at other medical schools, which responded by opening their own pathology laboratories. Once appointed by Daniel Coit Gilman, upon advice by John Shaw Billings, as founding dean of the medical school of the newly forming Johns Hopkins University that Gilman, as its first president, was planning, Welch traveled again to Germany for training in Koch's bacteriology in 1883. Welch returned to America but moved to Baltimore, eager to overhaul American medicine, while blending Virchow's anatomical pathology, Cohnheim's experimental pathology, and Koch's bacteriology. Hopkins medical school, led by the "Four Horsemen"—Welch, William Osler, Howard A. Kelly, and William Stewart Halsted—opened in 1893 as America's first medical school devoted to teaching German scientific medicine.

=== Twentieth century ===
==== Biomedicine ====
The first biomedical institutes, Pasteur Institute and Berlin Institute for Infectious Diseases, whose first directors were Louis Pasteur and Robert Koch, were founded in 1888 and 1891, respectively. America's first biomedical institute, The Rockefeller Institute for Medical Research, was founded in 1901 with Welch, nicknamed "dean of American medicine", as its scientific director, who appointed his former Hopkins student Simon Flexner as director of the pathology and bacteriology laboratories. Through the influence of World War I and World War II, the Rockefeller Institute emerged as the world's leading institution in biomedical research.

==== Molecular paradigm ====
The 1918 pandemic triggered a frenzied search for its cause, although most deaths were via lobar pneumonia, already attributed to pneumococcal invasion. In London, in 1928, a pathologist from the Ministry of Health named Fred Griffith documented pneumococcal transformation, showing how it could change from virulent to avirulent and shift between antigenic types—almost as if it was a different species—questioning pneumonia's straightforward causation. The laboratory of Rockefeller Institute's Oswald T. Avery, an early pneumococcal expert, was so troubled by the report that they refused to attempt repetition.

During Avery's summer vacation, Martin Henry Dawson, a British-Canadian who believed everything from England was correct by default, repeated Griffith's results and achieved transformation in vitro, making it a more precise investigation. Having returned, Avery kept a photo of Griffith on his desk while his researchers followed the trail. In 1944, Avery, Colin Munro MacLeod, and Maclyn McCarty reported the transformation factor as DNA, widely doubted amid estimations that something must act with it. At the time of Griffith's report, it was unrecognized that bacteria even had genes.

The first genetics, Mendelian genetics, began in 1900, yet inheritance of Mendelian traits was localized to chromosomes by 1903, thus chromosomal genetics. Biochemistry emerged in the same decade. In the 1940s, most scientists viewed the cell as a "sack of chemicals"—a membrane containing only loose molecules in Brownian motion—and the only especial cell structures as chromosomes, which bacteria lack as such. Chromosomal DNA was presumed too simple, so genes were sought in chromosomal proteins. Yet in 1953, American biologist James Watson, British physicist Francis Crick, and British chemist Rosalind Franklin inferred DNA's molecular structure—a double helix—and conjectured it to spell a code. In the early 1960s, Crick helped crack the genetic code in DNA thus establishing molecular genetics.

In the late 1930s, the Rockefeller Foundation had spearheaded and funded the molecular biology research program—seeking a fundamental explanation of organisms and life—led largely by physicist Max Delbrück at Caltech and Vanderbilt University. Yet the reality of organelles in cells was controversial amid unclear visualization with conventional light microscopy. Around 1940, largely via cancer research at Rockefeller Institute, cell biology emerged as a new discipline filling the vast gap between cytology and biochemistry by applying new technology—ultracentrifuge and electron microscope—to identify and deconstruct cell structures, functions, and mechanisms. The two new sciences interlaced, cell and molecular biology.

Mindful of Griffith and Avery, Joshua Lederberg confirmed bacterial conjugation—reported decades earlier but controversial—and was awarded the 1958 Nobel Prize in Physiology or Medicine. At Cold Spring Harbor Laboratory in Long Island, New York, Max Delbrück and Salvador Luria led the Phage Group—hosting Watson—discovering details of cell physiology by tracking changes to bacteria upon infection with their viruses, the process transduction. Lederberg led the opening of a genetics department at Stanford University's medical school, and facilitated greater communication between biologists and medical departments.

==== Disease mechanisms ====
In the 1950s, research on rheumatic fever, a complication of streptococcal infections, revealed it was mediated by the host's own immune response, stirring investigation by pathologist Lewis Thomas that led to identification of enzymes released by the innate immune cells macrophages and that degrade host tissue. In the late 1970s, as president of Memorial Sloan–Kettering Cancer Center, Thomas collaborated with Lederberg, soon to become president of Rockefeller University, to redirect the funding focus of the US National Institutes of Health toward basic research into the mechanisms operating during disease processes, which at the time medical scientists were all but wholly ignorant of, as biologists had scarcely taken interest in disease mechanisms.

== Examples ==
=== Parkinson's disease ===
The pathophysiology of Parkinson's disease (PD) involves the apoptosis, or programmed cell death, of dopaminergic neurons as a consequence of alterations in biological activity within the brain related to the disorder. Several mechanisms have been proposed to explain neuronal apoptosis in PD; however, not all of these mechanisms are fully understood. The five primary mechanisms believed to contribute to neuronal death in PD include protein aggregation within Lewy bodies, disruption of autophagy processes, alterations in cellular metabolism and mitochondrial function, neuroinflammation, and breakdown of the blood-brain barrier, resulting in vascular compromise.

=== Heart failure ===
The pathophysiology of heart failure involves a reduction in the efficiency of the cardiac muscle through damage or overloading. As such, it can be caused by a wide number of conditions, including myocardial infarction (in which ischemia of the heart muscle leads to its death), hypertension (which increases the force of contraction needed to pump blood), and amyloidosis (in which misfolded proteins are deposited in the heart muscle, causing it to stiffen). Over time, these increase the workload of the heart, leading to changes in the heart muscle itself.

=== Multiple sclerosis ===
The pathophysiology of multiple sclerosis (MS) is that of an inflammatory demyelinating disease in which activated immune cells invade the central nervous system and cause neuroinflammation, neurodegeneration, and tissue damage. The underlying precipitators of MS are incompletely defined. Current research in neuropathology, neuroimmunology, neurobiology, neuroimaging, clinical neurology, and psychiatry provides support for the notion that MS is not a single disease but rather a spectrum.

=== Hypertension ===
The pathophysiology of hypertension is that of a chronic disease characterized by elevation of blood pressure. Hypertension can be classified by cause as either essential (also known as primary or idiopathic hypertension) or secondary. About 90–95% of hypertension is essential hypertension.

=== HIV/AIDS ===
The pathophysiology of HIV/AIDS involves the acquisition of HIV and the replication of the virus inside T helper cells, causing lysis. T helper cells are required for almost all adaptive immune system responses. There is typically an initial period of influenza-like illness following acquisition, and then a latent, asymptomatic phase. When the CD4 lymphocyte count falls below 200 cells/ml of blood, the HIV host has progressed to AIDS, a condition characterized by deficiency in cell-mediated immunity and resultant increase in susceptibility to opportunistic infections and some cancers.

=== Spider bites ===
The pathophysiology of spider bites involves the effect of injected venom. A spider envenomation occurs when a spider injects venom into the skin. Not all spider bites deliver venom—a dry bite—and the amount of venom injected can vary depending on the type of spider and the circumstances of the encounter. The mechanical injury from a spider bite is generally not a serious concern for humans.

=== Obesity ===
The pathophysiology of obesity involves many developmental and maintenance processes.

Research on obesity, as well as clinical obesity medicine, and had been almost unapproached until the leptin gene was discovered in 1994 in Jeffrey M. Friedman's laboratory. The investigators hypothesized that leptin functions as a satiety factor. In the ob/ob mouse, mutations in the leptin gene led to the obese phenotype, suggesting potential for leptin-based therapies for human obesity. However, shortly after, Jose F. Caro's team failed to find any leptin gene mutations in humans with obesity. Instead, they observed increased leptin expression, indicating potential leptin resistance in human obesity.

== See also ==
- Pathogenesis
