= Alveolar–arterial gradient =

Respiratory parameter for differential diagnosis of hypoxemia

Pathophysiology sample values
BMP/ELECTROLYTES:
| Na^{+} = 140 | Cl^{−} = 100 | BUN = 20 | / Glu = 150 \ |
| K^{+} = 4 | CO_{2} = 22 | PCr = 1.0 | / Glu = 150 \ |
ARTERIAL BLOOD GAS:
| HCO_{3}^{−} = 24 | p_{a}CO_{2} = 40 | p_{a}O_{2} = 95 | pH = 7.40 |
ALVEOLAR GAS:
| | p_{A}CO_{2} = 36 | p_{A}O_{2} = 105 | A-a g = 10 |
OTHER:
| Ca = 9.5 | Mg^{2+} = 2.0 | PO_{4} = 1 |
| CK = 55 | BE = −0.36 | AG = 16 |
SERUM OSMOLARITY/RENAL:
| PMO = 300 | PCO = 295 | POG = 5 | BUN:Cr = 20 |
URINALYSIS:
| UNa^{+} = 80 | UCl^{−} = 100 | UAG = 5 | FENa = 0.95 |
| UK^{+} = 25 | USG = 1.01 | UCr = 60 | UO = 800 |
PROTEIN/GI/LIVER FUNCTION TESTS:
| LDH = 100 | TP = 7.6 | AST = 25 | TBIL = 0.7 |
| ALP = 71 | Alb = 4.0 | ALT = 40 | BC = 0.5 |
| | | AST/ALT = 0.6 | BU = 0.2 |
| AF alb = 3.0 | SAAG = 1.0 | | SOG = 60 |
CSF:
| CSF alb = 30 | CSF glu = 60 | CSF/S alb = 7.5 | CSF/S glu = 0.6 |

The Alveolar–arterial gradient (A-aO_{2}, or A–a gradient), is a measure of the difference between the alveolar concentration (A) of oxygen and the arterial (a) concentration of oxygen. It is a useful parameter for narrowing the differential diagnosis of hypoxemia.

The A–a gradient helps to assess the integrity of the alveolar capillary unit. For example, in high altitude, the arterial oxygen PaO_{2} is low but only because the alveolar oxygen (PAO_{2}) is also low. However, in states of ventilation perfusion mismatch, such as pulmonary embolism or right-to-left shunt, oxygen is not effectively transferred from the alveoli to the blood which results in an elevated A-a gradient.

In a perfect system, no A-a gradient would exist: oxygen would diffuse and equalize across the capillary membrane, and the pressures in the arterial system and alveoli would be effectively equal (resulting in an A-a gradient of zero). However even though the partial pressure of oxygen is about equilibrated between the pulmonary capillaries and the alveolar gas, this equilibrium is not maintained as blood travels further through pulmonary circulation. As a rule, PAO_{2} is always higher than P_{a}O_{2} by at least 5–10 mmHg, even in a healthy person with normal ventilation and perfusion. This gradient exists due to both physiological right-to-left shunting and a physiological V/Q mismatch caused by gravity-dependent differences in perfusion to various zones of the lungs. The bronchial vessels deliver nutrients and oxygen to certain lung tissues, and some of this spent, deoxygenated venous blood drains into the highly oxygenated pulmonary veins, causing a right-to-left shunt. Further, the effects of gravity alter the flow of both blood and air through various heights of the lung. In the upright lung, both perfusion and ventilation are greatest at the base, but the gradient of perfusion is steeper than that of ventilation so V/Q ratio is higher at the apex than at the base. This means that blood flowing through capillaries at the base of the lung is not fully oxygenated.

== Equation ==
The equation for calculating the A–a gradient is:

$\text{A–a Gradient}=P_A\ce{O2}-P_a\ce{O2}$

Where:

- PAO_{2} = alveolar PO_{2} (calculated from the alveolar gas equation)

$$P_A\ce{O2}=F_i\ce{O2}(P_\ce{atm}-P_\ce{H2O})-\frac{P_a\ce{CO2}}{0.8}$$

- P_{a}O_{2} = arterial PO_{2} (measured in arterial blood)

In its expanded form, the A–a gradient can be calculated by:

$$\text{A–a Gradient}=\left(F_i\ce{O2}(P_\text{atm}-P_\ce{H2O})-\frac{P_a\ce{CO2}}{0.8}\right)-P_a\ce{O2}$$

On room air ( F_{i}O_{2} = 0.21, or 21% ), at sea level ( P_{atm} = 760 mmHg ) assuming 100% humidity in the alveoli (P_{H_{2}O} = 47 mmHg), a simplified version of the equation is:

$$\text{A–a Gradient}=\begin{cases}
\left(150\text{ mm}\ce{Hg}-\frac{5}{4}(P_a\ce{CO2})\right)-P_a\ce{O2}\quad\text{or}\\
\left(20\text{ kPa}-\frac{5}{4}(P_a\ce{CO2})\right)-P_a\ce{O2}
\end{cases}$$

== Values and Clinical Significance ==
The A–a gradient is useful in determining the source of hypoxemia. The measurement helps isolate the location of the problem as either intrapulmonary (within the lungs) or extrapulmonary (elsewhere in the body).

A normal A–a gradient for a young adult non-smoker breathing air, is between 5–10 mmHg. Normally, the A–a gradient increases with age. For every decade a person has lived, their A–a gradient is expected to increase by 1 mmHg. A conservative estimate of normal A–a gradient is [age in years + 10]/ 4. Thus, a 40-year-old should have an A–a gradient around 12.5 mmHg. The value calculated for a patient's A-a gradient can assess if their hypoxia is due to the dysfunction of the alveolar-capillary unit, for which it will elevate, or due to another reason, in which the A-a gradient will be at or lower than the calculated value using the above equation.

An abnormally increased A–a gradient suggests a defect in diffusion, V/Q mismatch, or right-to-left shunt.

The A-a gradient has clinical utility in patients with hypoxemia of undetermined etiology. The A-a gradient can be broken down categorically as either elevated or normal. Causes of hypoxemia will fall into either category. To better understand which etiologies of hypoxemia falls in either category, we can use a simple analogy. Think of the oxygen's journey through the body like a river. The respiratory system will serve as the first part of the river. Then imagine a waterfall from that point leading to the second part of the river. The waterfall represents the alveolar and capillary walls, and the second part of the river represents the arterial system. The river empties into a lake, which can represent end-organ perfusion. The A-a gradient helps to determine where there is flow obstruction.

For example, consider hypoventilation. Patients can exhibit hypoventilation for a variety of reasons; some include CNS depression, neuromuscular diseases such as myasthenia gravis, poor chest elasticity as seen in kyphoscoliosis or patients with vertebral fractures, and many others. Patients with poor ventilation lack oxygen tension throughout their arterial system in addition to the respiratory system. Thus, the river will have decreased flow throughout both parts. Since both the "A" and the "a" decrease in concert, the gradient between the two will remain in normal limits (even though both values will decrease). Thus patients with hypoxemia due to hypoventilation will have an A-a gradient within normal limits.

Now let us consider pneumonia. Patients with pneumonia have a physical barrier within the alveoli, which limits the diffusion of oxygen into the capillaries. However, these patients can ventilate (unlike the patient with hypoventilation), which will result in a well-oxygenated respiratory tract (A) with poor diffusion of oxygen across the alveolar-capillary unit and thus lower oxygen levels in the arterial blood (a). The obstruction, in this case, would occur at the waterfall in our example, limiting the flow of water only through the second part of the river. Thus patients with hypoxemia due to pneumonia will have an inappropriately elevated A-a gradient (due to normal "A" and low "a").

Applying this analogy to different causes of hypoxemia should help reason out whether to expect an elevated or normal A-a gradient. As a general rule of thumb, any pathology of the alveolar-capillary unit will result in a high A-a gradient. The table below has the different disease states that cause hypoxemia.

Because A–a gradient is approximated as: (150 − 5/4(PCO_{2})) – PaO_{2} at sea level and on room air (0.21x(760-47) = 149.7 mmHg for the alveolar oxygen partial pressure, after accounting for the water vapor), the direct mathematical cause of a large value is that the blood has a low PaO_{2}, a low PaCO_{2}, or both. CO_{2} is very easily exchanged in the lungs and low PaCO_{2} directly correlates with high minute ventilation; therefore a low arterial PaCO_{2} indicates that extra respiratory effort is being used to oxygenate the blood. A low PaO_{2} indicates that the patient's current minute ventilation (whether high or normal) is not enough to allow adequate oxygen diffusion into the blood. Therefore, the A–a gradient essentially demonstrates a high respiratory effort (low arterial PaCO_{2}) relative to the achieved level of oxygenation (arterial PaO_{2}). A high A–a gradient could indicate a patient breathing hard to achieve normal oxygenation, a patient breathing normally and attaining low oxygenation, or a patient breathing hard and still failing to achieve normal oxygenation.

If lack of oxygenation is proportional to low respiratory effort, then the A–a gradient is not increased; a healthy person who hypoventilates would have hypoxia, but a normal A–a gradient. At an extreme, high CO_{2} levels from hypoventilation can mask an existing high A–a gradient. This mathematical artifact makes A–a gradient more clinically useful in the setting of hyperventilation.

== See also ==
- Pulmonary gas pressures
