= CSF glucose =

- Reference range: 2.5–4.4 mmol/L (45-80mg/dL)
- LOINC: 2342-4 (MCnc), 14744-7 (SCnc)

CSF glucose or glycorrhachia is a measurement used to determine the concentration of glucose in cerebrospinal fluid (CSF).

== Normal values in humans ==
Pathophysiology sample values
BMP/ELECTROLYTES:
Na^{+} = 140	Cl^{−} = 100	BUN = 20	/ Glu = 150 \
K^{+} = 4	CO_{2} = 22	PCr = 1.0	/ Glu = 150 \
ARTERIAL BLOOD GAS:
HCO_{3}^{−} = 24	p_{a}CO_{2} = 40	p_{a}O_{2} = 95	pH = 7.40
ALVEOLAR GAS:
	p_{A}CO_{2} = 36	p_{A}O_{2} = 105	A-a g = 10
OTHER:
Ca = 9.5	Mg^{2+} = 2.0	PO_{4} = 1
CK = 55	BE = −0.36	AG = 16
SERUM OSMOLARITY/RENAL:
PMO = 300	PCO = 295	POG = 5	BUN:Cr = 20
URINALYSIS:
UNa^{+} = 80	UCl^{−} = 100	UAG = 5	FENa = 0.95
UK^{+} = 25	USG = 1.01	UCr = 60	UO = 800
PROTEIN/GI/LIVER FUNCTION TESTS:
LDH = 100	TP = 7.6	AST = 25	TBIL = 0.7
ALP = 71	Alb = 4.0	ALT = 40	BC = 0.5
		AST/ALT = 0.6	BU = 0.2
AF alb = 3.0	SAAG = 1.0		SOG = 60
CSF:
CSF alb = 30	CSF glu = 60	CSF/S alb = 7.5	CSF/S glu = 0.6

The glucose level in CSF is proportional to the blood glucose level and corresponds to 60-70% of the concentration in blood. Therefore, normal CSF glucose levels lie between 2.5 and 4.4 mmol/L (45–80 mg/dL).

== Abnormalities in CSF glucose concentration ==
=== Low CSF glucose levels ===
Hypoglycorrhachia (low CSF glucose levels) can be caused by CNS infections, inflammatory conditions, subarachnoid hemorrhage, hypoglycemia (low blood sugar), impaired glucose transport (e.g. GLUT1 deficiency syndrome), increased CNS glycolytic activity and metastatic carcinoma.

CSF glucose levels can be useful in distinguishing among causes of meningitis as more than 50% of patients with bacterial meningitis have decreased CSF glucose levels while patients with viral meningitis usually have normal CSF glucose levels. Decrease in glucose levels during a CNS infection is caused due to glycolysis by both white cells and the pathogen, and impaired CSF glucose transport through the blood-brain barrier.

=== High CSF glucose levels ===
There is no pathologic process that directly leads to hyperglycorrhachia (high CSF glucose levels) and therefore, high CSF glucose levels have no specific diagnostic importance.

However, elevated blood sugar levels (hyperglycemia) result in elevated CSF glucose levels as the CSF glucose level is proportional to the blood glucose level with glucose being actively transported as well as simply diffusing down the concentration gradient from blood to CSF. In addition, damage to small blood vessels during lumbar puncture (traumatic tap) can lead to an increased CSF glucose since the blood that enters the collected CSF sample contains higher levels of glucose.

CSF glucose levels do not generally exceed 16.7 mmol/L (300 mg/dL).

== See also ==
- Blood sugar
- CSF/serum glucose ratio
