= Pulmonary gas pressures =

Component of respiratory physiology

Pathophysiology sample values
BMP/ELECTROLYTES:
Na^{+} = 140	Cl^{−} = 100	BUN = 20	/ Glu = 150 \
K^{+} = 4	CO_{2} = 22	PCr = 1.0	/ Glu = 150 \
ARTERIAL BLOOD GAS:
HCO_{3}^{−} = 24	p_{a}CO_{2} = 40	p_{a}O_{2} = 95	pH = 7.40
ALVEOLAR GAS:
	p_{A}CO_{2} = 36	p_{A}O_{2} = 105	A-a g = 10
OTHER:
Ca = 9.5	Mg^{2+} = 2.0	PO_{4} = 1
CK = 55	BE = −0.36	AG = 16
SERUM OSMOLARITY/RENAL:
PMO = 300	PCO = 295	POG = 5	BUN:Cr = 20
URINALYSIS:
UNa^{+} = 80	UCl^{−} = 100	UAG = 5	FENa = 0.95
UK^{+} = 25	USG = 1.01	UCr = 60	UO = 800
PROTEIN/GI/LIVER FUNCTION TESTS:
LDH = 100	TP = 7.6	AST = 25	TBIL = 0.7
ALP = 71	Alb = 4.0	ALT = 40	BC = 0.5
		AST/ALT = 0.6	BU = 0.2
AF alb = 3.0	SAAG = 1.0		SOG = 60
CSF:
CSF alb = 30	CSF glu = 60	CSF/S alb = 7.5	CSF/S glu = 0.6

The factors that determine the values for alveolar pO_{2} and pCO_{2} are:

- The pressure of outside air
- The partial pressures of inspired oxygen and carbon dioxide
- The rates of total body oxygen consumption and carbon dioxide production
- The rates of alveolar ventilation and perfusion

== Partial pressures ==
The partial pressures (in torr) for a human at rest:

=== Partial pressure of oxygen (at sea level) ===
Location	pO_{2} (torr or mmHg)
Ambient air	159
Alveoli	104 (P_{A}O_{2})
Arterial blood	95-100 (P_{a}O_{2})
Venous blood	40-50
Non-lung Capillaries	20-40

The alveolar oxygen partial pressure is lower than the atmospheric O_{2} partial pressure for two reasons.

- Firstly, as the air enters the lungs, it is humidified by the upper airway and thus the partial pressure of water vapour (47 mmHg) reduces the oxygen partial pressure to about 150 mmHg.
- The rest of the difference is due to the continual uptake of oxygen by the pulmonary capillaries, and the continual diffusion of CO_{2} out of the capillaries into the alveoli.

The alveolar pO_{2} is not routinely measured but is calculated from blood gas measurements by the alveolar gas equation.

=== Partial pressure of carbon dioxide ===
Location	pCO_{2} (torr or mmHg)
Outside air - dry air at sea level	0.3
Alveolar air	35
Arteriole blood	40
Venous blood	50
Cells	50

== Pathology ==
The partial pressure of carbon dioxide, along with the pH, can be used to differentiate between metabolic acidosis, metabolic alkalosis, respiratory acidosis, and respiratory alkalosis.

Hypoventilation exists when the ratio of carbon dioxide production to alveolar ventilation increases above normal values – greater than 45mmHg. If pH is also less than 7.35 this is respiratory acidosis.

Hyperventilation exists when the same ratio decreases – less than 35mmHg. If the pH is also greater than 7.45 this is respiratory alkalosis.

== See also ==
- Alveolar-arterial gradient
- Diffusing capacity
- Pulmonary alveolus
