= Fractional excretion of sodium =

Percentage of kidney-filtered sodium excreted in urine

Pathophysiology sample values
BMP/ELECTROLYTES:
Na^{+} = 140	Cl^{−} = 100	BUN = 20	/ Glu = 150 \
K^{+} = 4	CO_{2} = 22	PCr = 1.0	/ Glu = 150 \
ARTERIAL BLOOD GAS:
HCO_{3}^{−} = 24	p_{a}CO_{2} = 40	p_{a}O_{2} = 95	pH = 7.40
ALVEOLAR GAS:
	p_{A}CO_{2} = 36	p_{A}O_{2} = 105	A-a g = 10
OTHER:
Ca = 9.5	Mg^{2+} = 2.0	PO_{4} = 1
CK = 55	BE = −0.36	AG = 16
SERUM OSMOLARITY/RENAL:
PMO = 300	PCO = 295	POG = 5	BUN:Cr = 20
URINALYSIS:
UNa^{+} = 80	UCl^{−} = 100	UAG = 5	FENa = 0.95
UK^{+} = 25	USG = 1.01	UCr = 60	UO = 800
PROTEIN/GI/LIVER FUNCTION TESTS:
LDH = 100	TP = 7.6	AST = 25	TBIL = 0.7
ALP = 71	Alb = 4.0	ALT = 40	BC = 0.5
		AST/ALT = 0.6	BU = 0.2
AF alb = 3.0	SAAG = 1.0		SOG = 60
CSF:
CSF alb = 30	CSF glu = 60	CSF/S alb = 7.5	CSF/S glu = 0.6

The fractional excretion of sodium (FE_{Na}) is the percentage of the sodium filtered by the kidney which is excreted in the urine. It is measured in terms of plasma and urine sodium, rather than by the interpretation of urinary sodium concentration alone, as urinary sodium concentrations can vary with water reabsorption. Therefore, the urinary and plasma concentrations of sodium must be compared to get an accurate picture of kidney clearance. In clinical use, the fractional excretion of sodium can be calculated as part of the evaluation of acute kidney failure in order to determine if hypovolemia or decreased effective circulating plasma volume is a contributor to the kidney failure.

== Calculation ==
FE_{Na} is calculated in two parts—figuring out how much sodium is excreted in the urine, and then finding its ratio to the total amount of sodium that passed through (a.k.a. "filtered by") the kidney.

First, the actual amount of sodium excreted is calculated by multiplying the urine sodium concentration by the urinary flow rate (UFR). This is the numerator in the equation. The denominator is the total amount of sodium filtered by the kidneys. This is calculated by multiplying the plasma sodium concentration by the glomerular filtration rate (GFR) calculated using creatinine filtration. The flow rates then cancel out, simplifying to the standard equation:

$$\begin{align}
\text{FE}_\ce{Na} &= 100 \times
\frac{ [\ce{Na}]_\text{urinary} \times \text{UFR} }{ [\ce{Na}]_\text{plasma} \times \text{GFR} } \\[4pt]
&= 100 \times
\frac{ [\ce{Na}]_\text{urinary} \times \text{UFR} }{ [\ce{Na}]_\text{plasma} \times \left(\frac{ [\text{creatinine}]_\text{urinary} \times \text{UFR} }{ [\text{creatinine}]_\text{plasma} }\right) } \\[4pt]
&= 100 \times \frac{ [\ce{Na}]_\text{urinary} \times [\text{creatinine}]_\text{plasma} }{ [\ce{Na}]_\text{plasma} \times [\text{creatinine}]_\text{urinary} }
\end{align}$$

Sodium (mmol/L) Creatinine (mg/dL)

For ease of recall, one can just remember the fractional excretion of sodium is the clearance of sodium divided by the glomerular filtration rate (i.e. the "fraction" excreted).

== Interpretation ==
FE_{Na} can be useful in the evaluation of acute kidney failure in the context of low urine output. Low fractional excretion indicates sodium retention by the kidney, suggesting pathophysiology extrinsic to the urinary system such as volume depletion or decrease in effective circulating volume (e.g. low output heart failure). Higher values can suggest sodium wasting due to acute tubular necrosis or other causes of intrinsic kidney failure. The FE_{Na} may be affected or invalidated by diuretic use, since many diuretics act by altering the kidney's handling of sodium.

Value	Category	Description
below 1%	prerenal disease	the physiologic response to a decrease in kidney perfusion is an increase in sodium reabsorption to control hyponatremia, often caused by volume depletion or decrease in effective circulating volume (e.g. low output heart failure).
above 2% or 3%	acute tubular necrosis or other kidney damage (postrenal disease)	either excess sodium is lost due to tubular damage, or the damaged glomeruli result in hypovolemia resulting in the normal response of sodium wasting.
intermediate	either disorder	In renal tract obstruction, values may be either higher or lower than 1%. The value is lower in early disease, but with kidney damage from the obstruction, the value becomes higher.

== Exceptions in children and neonates ==
While the above values are useful for older children and adults, the FE_{Na} must be interpreted more cautiously in younger pediatric patients due to the limited ability of immature tubules to reabsorb sodium maximally. Thus, in term neonates, a FE_{Na} of <3% represents volume depletion, and a FE_{Na} as high as 4% may represent maximal sodium conservation in critically ill preterm neonates. The FE_{Na} may also be spuriously elevated in children with adrenal insufficiency or pre-existing kidney disease (such as obstructive uropathy) due to salt wasting.

== Exceptions in adults ==
The FE_{Na} is generally less than 1% in patients with hepatorenal syndrome and acute glomerulonephropathy. Although often reliable at discriminating between prerenal azotemia and acute tubular necrosis, the FE_{Na} has been reported to be <1% occasionally with oliguric and nonoliguric acute tubular necrosis, urinary tract obstruction, acute glomerulonephritis, renal allograft rejection, sepsis, and drug-related alterations in renal hemodynamics. Therefore, the utility of the test is best when used in conjunction with other clinical data.

== Alternatives ==
Fractional excretion of other substances can be measured to determine kidney clearance including urea, uric acid, and lithium. These can be used in patients undergoing diuretic therapy, since diuretics induce a natriuresis. Thus, the urinary sodium concentration and FE_{Na} may be higher in patients receiving diuretics in spite of prerenal pathology.

== See also ==
- Urinary index
