= Arterial blood gas test =

Blood test that measures amounts of dissolved gas

Arterial-blood gas test
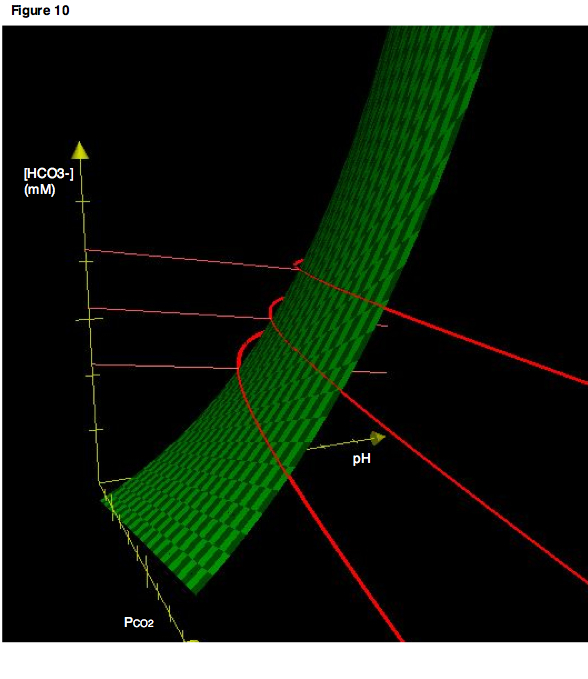
- MeSH: D001784
- MedlinePlus: 003855
- LOINC: 24336-0

An arterial blood gas (ABG) test, or arterial blood gas analysis (ABGA) measures the amounts of arterial gases, such as oxygen and carbon dioxide. An ABG test requires that a small volume of blood be drawn from the radial artery with a syringe and a thin needle, but sometimes the femoral artery in the groin or another site is used. The blood can also be drawn from an arterial catheter.

An ABG test measures the blood gas tension values of the arterial partial pressure of oxygen (PaO2), and the arterial partial pressure of carbon dioxide (PaCO2), and the blood's pH. In addition, the arterial oxygen saturation (SaO2) can be determined. Such information is vital when caring for patients with critical illnesses or respiratory disease. Therefore, the ABG test is one of the most common tests performed on patients in intensive-care units. In other levels of care, pulse oximetry plus transcutaneous carbon-dioxide measurement is a less invasive, alternative method of obtaining similar information.

An ABG test can indirectly measure the level of bicarbonate in the blood. The bicarbonate level is calculated using the Henderson-Hasselbalch equation. Many blood-gas analyzers will also report concentrations of lactate, hemoglobin, several electrolytes, oxyhemoglobin, carboxyhemoglobin, and methemoglobin. ABG testing is mainly used in pulmonology and critical-care medicine to determine gas exchange across the alveolar-capillary membrane. ABG testing also has a variety of applications in other areas of medicine. Combinations of disorders can be complex and difficult to interpret, so calculators, nomograms, and rules of thumb are commonly used.

ABG samples originally were sent from the clinic to the medical laboratory for analysis. Newer equipment lets the analysis be done also as point-of-care testing, depending on the equipment available in each clinic.

== Sampling and analysis ==
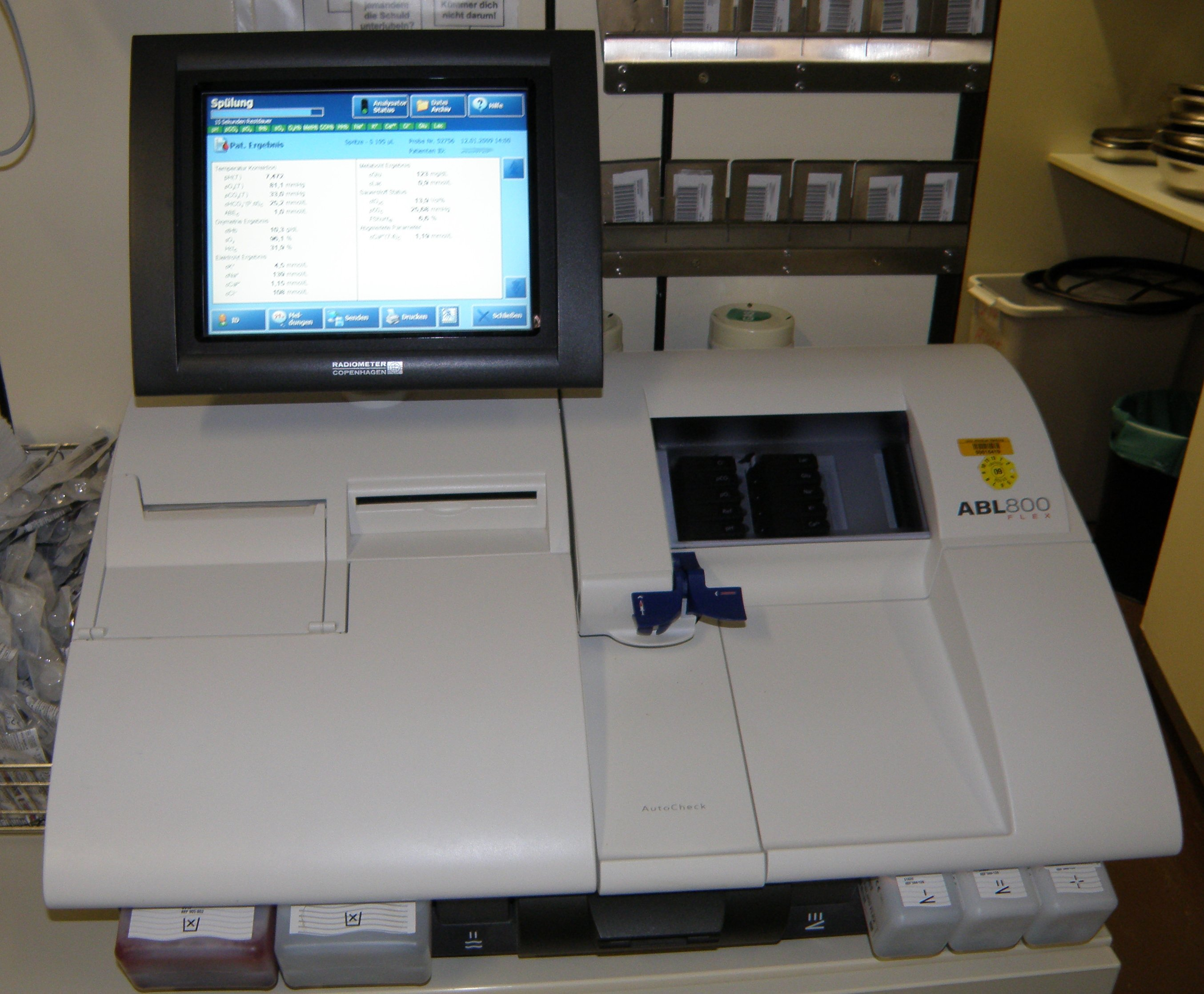
Bench top analyzer ABL800 FLEX - Radiometer Medical

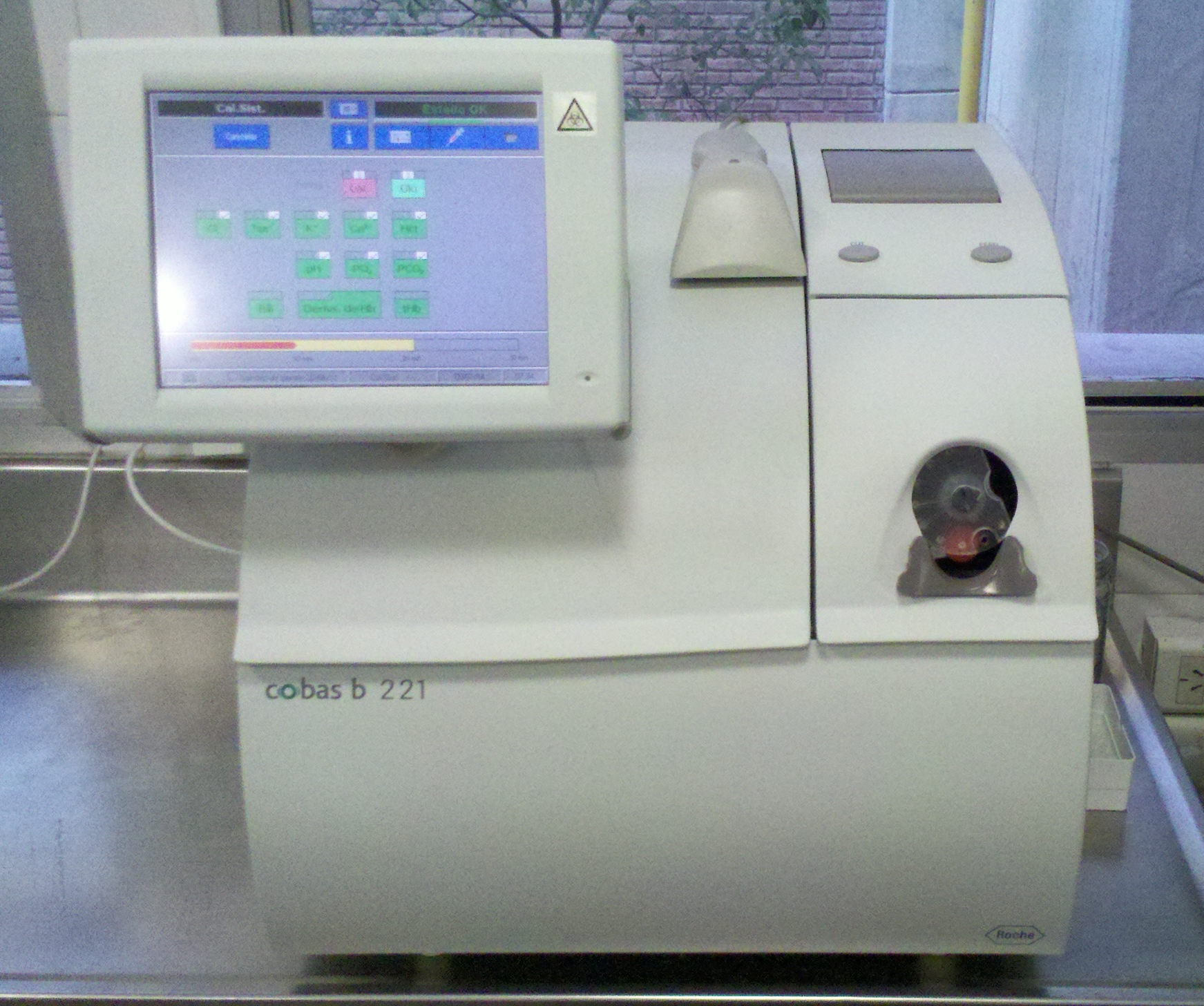
Modern, blood gas analyzer. This device is capable of reporting pH, pCO_{2}, pO_{2}, SatO_{2}, Na^{+}, K^{+}, Cl^{−}, Ca^{2+}, Hemoglobin (total and derivatives: O_{2}Hb, MetHb, COHb, HHb, CNHb, SHb ), Hematocrit, Total bilirubin, Glucose, Lactate and Urea. (Cobas b 221 - Roche Diagnostics).

Arterial blood for blood-gas analysis is usually drawn by a respiratory therapist and sometimes a phlebotomist, a nurse, a paramedic or a doctor. Blood is most commonly drawn from the radial artery because it is easily accessible, can be compressed to control bleeding, and has less risk for vascular occlusion. The selection of which radial artery to draw from is based on the outcome of an Allen's test. The brachial artery (or less often, the femoral artery) is also used, especially during emergency situations or with children. Blood can also be taken from an arterial catheter already placed in one of these arteries.

There are plastic and glass syringes used for blood gas samples. Most syringes come pre-packaged and contain a small amount of heparin, to prevent coagulation. Other syringes may need to be heparinised, by drawing up a small amount of liquid heparin and squirting it out again to remove air bubbles. Once the sample is obtained, care is taken to eliminate visible gas bubbles, as these bubbles can dissolve into the sample and cause inaccurate results. The sealed syringe is taken to a blood gas analyzer. If a plastic blood gas syringe is used, the sample should be transported and kept at room temperature and analyzed within 30 min. If prolonged time delays are expected (i.e., greater than 30 min) prior to analysis, the sample should be drawn in a glass syringe and immediately placed on ice. Standard blood tests can also be performed on arterial blood, such as measuring glucose, lactate, hemoglobins, dyshemoglobins, bilirubin and electrolytes.

Derived parameters include bicarbonate concentration, SaO2, and base excess. Bicarbonate concentration is calculated from the measured pH and PCO2 using the Henderson-Hasselbalch equation. SaO2 is derived from the measured PO2 and calculated based on the assumption that all measured hemoglobin is normal (oxy- or deoxy-) hemoglobin.

=== Calculations ===
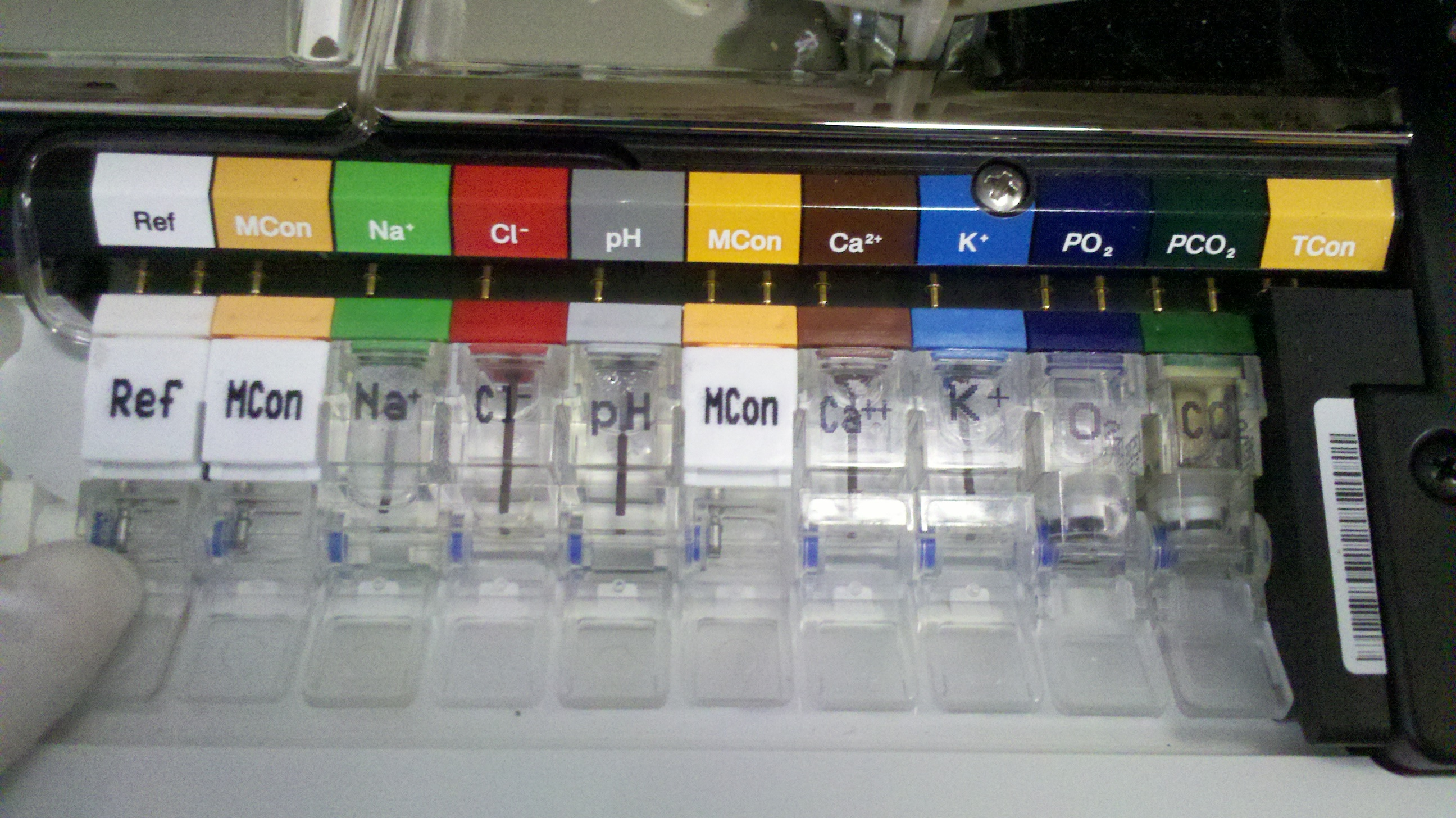
Detail of measurement chamber of a modern blood gas analyzer showing the measurement electrodes. (Cobas b 121 - Roche Diagnostics)

The machine used for analysis aspirates this blood from the syringe and measures the pH and the partial pressures of oxygen and carbon dioxide. The bicarbonate concentration is also calculated. These results are usually available for interpretation within ten to fifteen minutes.

Two methods have been used in medicine in the management of blood gases of patients in hypothermia: pH-stat method and alpha-stat method. A recent systematic review from 2025 suggests that neither method consistently demonstrates superiority over the other.

- pH-stat: The pH and other ABG results are measured at the patient's actual temperature. The goal is to maintain a pH of 7.40 and the arterial carbon dioxide tension (paCO_{2}) at 5.3 kPa (40 mmHg) at the actual patient temperature. It is necessary to add CO_{2} to the oxygenator to accomplish this goal.
- α-stat (alpha-stat): The pH and other ABG results are measured at 37 °C, despite the patient's actual temperature. The goal is to maintain the arterial carbon dioxide tension at 5.3 kPa (40mmHg) and the pH at 7.40 when measured at +37 °C.

Both the pH-stat and alpha-stat strategies have theoretical disadvantages. α-stat method is the method of choice for optimal myocardial function. The pH-stat method may result in loss of autoregulation in the brain (coupling of the cerebral blood flow with the metabolic rate in the brain). By increasing the cerebral blood flow beyond the metabolic requirements, the pH-stat method may lead to cerebral microembolisation and intracranial hypertension.

=== Guidelines ===
1. A 1 mmHg change in PaCO_{2} above or below 40 mmHg results in 0.008 unit change in pH in the opposite direction.
2. The PaCO_{2} will decrease by about 1 mmHg for every 1 mEq/L reduction in [HCO^{−}_{3}] below 24 mEq/L
3. A change in [HCO^{−}_{3}] of 10 mEq/L will result in a change in pH of approximately 0.15 pH units in the same direction.
4. Assess relation of pCO_{2} with pH: If pCO_{2} & pH are moving in opposite directions i.e., pCO_{2} ↑ when pH is <7.4 or pCO_{2} ↓ when pH > 7.4, it is a primary respiratory disorder. If pCO_{2} & pH are moving in same direction i.e., pCO_{2} ↑when pH is >7.4 or pCO_{2} ↓ when pH < 7.4, it is a primary metabolic disorder.

== Parameters and reference ranges ==
These are typical reference ranges, although various analysers and laboratories may employ different ranges.

Analyte	Range	Interpretation
pH	7.34–7.44	The pH or H^{+} indicates if a person is acidemic (pH < 7.35; H^{+} >45) or alkalemic (pH > 7.45; H^{+} < 35).
H^{+}	35–45 nmol/L (nM)	The pH or H^{+} indicates if a person is acidemic (pH < 7.35; H^{+} >45) or alkalemic (pH > 7.45; H^{+} < 35).
Arterial oxygen partial pressure (P_{a}O_{2})	10–13 kPa; 75–100 mmHg	A low PaO_{2} indicates abnormal oxygenation of blood and a person is known as having hypoxemia. (Note that a low PaO_{2} is not required for the person to have hypoxia as in cases of Ischemia, a lack of oxygen in tissues or organs as opposed to arterial blood.) At a P_{a}O_{2} of less than 60 mm Hg, supplemental oxygen should be administered.
Arterial carbon dioxide partial pressure (P_{a}CO_{2})	4.7–6.0 kPa; 35–45 mmHg	The carbon dioxide partial pressure (PaCO_{2}) is an indicator of CO_{2} production and elimination: for a constant metabolic rate, the PaCO_{2} is determined entirely by its elimination through ventilation. A high PaCO_{2} (respiratory acidosis, alternatively hypercapnia) indicates underventilation (or, more rarely, a hypermetabolic disorder), a low PaCO_{2} (respiratory alkalosis, alternatively hypocapnia) hyper- or overventilation.
HCO^{−}_{3}	22–26 mEq/L	The HCO^{−}_{3} ion indicates whether a metabolic problem is present (such as ketoacidosis). A low HCO^{−}_{3} indicates metabolic acidosis, a high HCO^{−}_{3} indicates metabolic alkalosis. As this value when given with blood gas results is often calculated by the analyzer, correlation should be checked with total CO_{2} levels as directly measured (see below).
SBC_{e}	21 to 27 mmol/L	the bicarbonate concentration in the blood at a CO_{2} of 5.33 kPa, full oxygen saturation and 37 Celsius.
Base excess	−2 to +2 mmol/L	The base excess is used for the assessment of the metabolic component of acid-base disorders, and indicates whether the person has metabolic acidosis or metabolic alkalosis. Contrasted with the bicarbonate levels, the base excess is a calculated value intended to completely isolate the non-respiratory portion of the pH change. There are two calculations for base excess (extra cellular fluid - BE(ecf); blood - BE(b)). The calculation used for the BE(ecf) = [HCO^{−}_{3}]− 24.8 + 16.2 × (pH − 7.4). The calculation used for BE(b) = (1 − 0.014 × Hgb) × ([HCO^{−}_{3}]− 24.8 + (1.43 × Hgb + 7.7) × (pH − 7.4).
total CO_{2} (tCO_{2} (P)_{c})	23–30 mmol/L; 100–132 mg/dL	This is the total amount of CO_{2}, and is the sum of HCO^{−}_{3} and PCO_{2} by the formula: tCO_{2} = [HCO^{−}_{3}] + α×PCO_{2}, where α=0.226 mM/kPa, HCO^{−}_{3} is expressed in millimolar concentration (mM) (mmol/L) and PCO_{2} is expressed in kPa
O_{2} Content (C_{a}O_{2}, C_{v}O_{2}, C_{c}O_{2})	94-100% (mL O_{2}/dL blood)	This is the sum of oxygen dissolved in plasma and chemically bound to hemoglobin as determined by the calculation: C_{a}O_{2} = (PaO_{2} × 0.003) + (SaO_{2} × 1.34 × Hgb) where hemoglobin concentration is expressed in g/dL.

Contamination of the sample with room air will result in abnormally low carbon dioxide and possibly elevated oxygen levels, and a concurrent elevation in pH. Delaying analysis (without chilling the sample) may result in inaccurately low oxygen and high carbon dioxide levels as a result of ongoing cellular respiration.

=== pH ===
Pathophysiology sample values
BMP/ELECTROLYTES:
Na^{+} = 140	Cl^{−} = 100	BUN = 20	/ Glu = 150 \
K^{+} = 4	CO_{2} = 22	PCr = 1.0	/ Glu = 150 \
ARTERIAL BLOOD GAS:
HCO_{3}^{−} = 24	p_{a}CO_{2} = 40	p_{a}O_{2} = 95	pH = 7.40
ALVEOLAR GAS:
	p_{A}CO_{2} = 36	p_{A}O_{2} = 105	A-a g = 10
OTHER:
Ca = 9.5	Mg^{2+} = 2.0	PO_{4} = 1
CK = 55	BE = −0.36	AG = 16
SERUM OSMOLARITY/RENAL:
PMO = 300	PCO = 295	POG = 5	BUN:Cr = 20
URINALYSIS:
UNa^{+} = 80	UCl^{−} = 100	UAG = 5	FENa = 0.95
UK^{+} = 25	USG = 1.01	UCr = 60	UO = 800
PROTEIN/GI/LIVER FUNCTION TESTS:
LDH = 100	TP = 7.6	AST = 25	TBIL = 0.7
ALP = 71	Alb = 4.0	ALT = 40	BC = 0.5
		AST/ALT = 0.6	BU = 0.2
AF alb = 3.0	SAAG = 1.0		SOG = 60
CSF:
CSF alb = 30	CSF glu = 60	CSF/S alb = 7.5	CSF/S glu = 0.6

The normal range for pH is 7.35–7.45. As the pH decreases (< 7.35), it implies acidosis, while if the pH increases (> 7.45) it implies alkalosis. In the context of arterial blood gases, the most common occurrence will be that of respiratory acidosis. Carbon dioxide is dissolved in the blood as carbonic acid, a weak acid; however, in large concentrations, it can affect the pH drastically. Whenever there is poor pulmonary ventilation, the carbon dioxide levels in the blood are expected to rise. This leads to a rise of carbonic acid, leading to a decrease in pH. The first buffer of pH will be the plasma proteins, since these can accept some H^{+} ions to try to maintain acid-base homeostasis. As carbon dioxide concentrations continue to increase (PaCO_{2} > 45 mmHg), a condition known as respiratory acidosis occurs. The body tries to maintain homeostasis by increasing the respiratory rate, a condition known as tachypnea. This allows much more carbon dioxide to escape the body through the lungs, thus increasing the pH by having less carbonic acid. If a person is in a critical setting and intubated, one must increase the number of breaths mechanically.

Respiratory alkalosis (Pa CO_{2} < 35 mmHg) occurs when there is too little carbon dioxide in the blood. This may be due to hyperventilation or else excessive breaths given via a mechanical ventilator in a critical care setting. The action to be taken is to calm the person and try to reduce the number of breaths being taken to normalize the pH. The respiratory pathway tries to compensate for the change in pH in a matter of 2–4 hours. If this is not enough, the metabolic pathway takes place.

Under normal conditions, the Henderson–Hasselbalch equation will give the blood pH

$$\ce{pH} = 6.1 + \log_{10}  \left ( \frac{[\ce{HCO3^-}]}{0.03 \times Pa\ce{CO2}} \right )$$

where:

- 6.1 is the acid dissociation constant (pK_{a}) of carbonic acid (H_{2}CO_{3}) at normal body temperature
- [HCO^{−}_{3}] is the concentration of bicarbonate in the blood in mEq/L
- PaCO_{2} is the partial pressure of carbon dioxide in the arterial blood in mmHg

The kidney and the lung are two main organs responsible for the metabolic homeostasis of pH. Bicarbonate is a base that helps to accept excess hydrogen ions whenever there is acidaemia. However, this mechanism is slower than the respiratory pathway and may take from a few hours to 3 days to take effect. In acidaemia, the bicarbonate levels rise, so that they can neutralize the excess acid, while the contrary happens when there is alkalaemia. Thus when an arterial blood gas test reveals, for example, an elevated bicarbonate, the problem has been present for a couple of days, and metabolic compensation took place over a blood acidaemia problem.

In general, it is much easier to correct acute pH derangement by adjusting respiration. Metabolic compensations take place at a much later stage. However, in a critical setting, a person with a normal pH, a high CO_{2}, and a high bicarbonate means that, although there is a high carbon dioxide level, there is metabolic compensation. As a result, one must be careful as to not artificially adjust breaths to lower the carbon dioxide. In such case, lowering the carbon dioxide abruptly means that the bicarbonate will be in excess and will cause a metabolic alkalosis. In such a case, carbon dioxide levels should be slowly diminished.

== Arterial versus venous blood ==
Since the advent of pulse oximetry which measures oxygen saturation transcutaneously and is non-invasive, arterial blood is seldom used for the determination of oxygenation outside the ICU. Acid base status can be determined with venous blood precluding the pain and inconvenience of arterial blood sampling in most cases. When an indwelling arterial line catheter is present, arterial blood is easy to obtain and still used. Venous blood is generally used otherwise, usually from a peripheral vein, such as a forearm vein. The values of pH and HCO3 of venous blood are close enough to arterial blood for direct comparison. The pCO2 of venous blood is less reliably compared to arterial blood but may be used in some cases. The PO2 level of venous blood is always significantly lower than arterial and should be reported, labeled and interpreted as venous PO2.

== See also ==
- Anion gap
- Radial artery puncture
- Chemical equilibrium
- Hemoximetry
- Arteriovenous oxygen difference
