= Serum chloride =

Chloride in organisms

Pathophysiology sample values
BMP/ELECTROLYTES:
Na^{+} = 140	Cl^{−} = 100	BUN = 20	/ Glu = 150 \
K^{+} = 4	CO_{2} = 22	PCr = 1.0	/ Glu = 150 \
ARTERIAL BLOOD GAS:
HCO_{3}^{−} = 24	p_{a}CO_{2} = 40	p_{a}O_{2} = 95	pH = 7.40
ALVEOLAR GAS:
	p_{A}CO_{2} = 36	p_{A}O_{2} = 105	A-a g = 10
OTHER:
Ca = 9.5	Mg^{2+} = 2.0	PO_{4} = 1
CK = 55	BE = −0.36	AG = 16
SERUM OSMOLARITY/RENAL:
PMO = 300	PCO = 295	POG = 5	BUN:Cr = 20
URINALYSIS:
UNa^{+} = 80	UCl^{−} = 100	UAG = 5	FENa = 0.95
UK^{+} = 25	USG = 1.01	UCr = 60	UO = 800
PROTEIN/GI/LIVER FUNCTION TESTS:
LDH = 100	TP = 7.6	AST = 25	TBIL = 0.7
ALP = 71	Alb = 4.0	ALT = 40	BC = 0.5
		AST/ALT = 0.6	BU = 0.2
AF alb = 3.0	SAAG = 1.0		SOG = 60
CSF:
CSF alb = 30	CSF glu = 60	CSF/S alb = 7.5	CSF/S glu = 0.6

Chloride is an anion in the human body needed for metabolism (the process of turning food into energy). It also helps keep the body's acid-base balance. The amount of serum chloride is carefully controlled by the kidneys.

Chloride ions have important physiological roles. For instance, in the central nervous system, the inhibitory action of glycine and some of the action of GABA relies on the entry of Cl^{−} into specific neurons. Also, the chloride-bicarbonate exchanger biological transport protein relies on the chloride ion to increase the blood's capacity of carbon dioxide, in the form of the bicarbonate ion; this is the mechanism underpinning the chloride shift occurring as the blood passes through oxygen-consuming capillary beds.

The normal blood reference range of chloride for adults in most labs is 96 to 106 milliequivalents (mEq) per liter. The normal range may vary slightly from lab to lab. Normal ranges are usually shown next to results in the lab report. A diagnostic test may use a chloridometer to determine the serum chloride level.

The North American Dietary Reference Intake recommends a daily intake of between 2300 and 3600 mg/day for 25-year-old males.

Reference ranges for blood tests, showing blood content of chloride at far right in the spectrum.
