= Urine anion gap =

Urine test for diagnosing metabolic and kidney disorders

Pathophysiology sample values
BMP/ELECTROLYTES:
Na^{+} = 140	Cl^{−} = 100	BUN = 20	/ Glu = 150 \
K^{+} = 4	CO_{2} = 22	PCr = 1.0	/ Glu = 150 \
ARTERIAL BLOOD GAS:
HCO_{3}^{−} = 24	p_{a}CO_{2} = 40	p_{a}O_{2} = 95	pH = 7.40
ALVEOLAR GAS:
	p_{A}CO_{2} = 36	p_{A}O_{2} = 105	A-a g = 10
OTHER:
Ca = 9.5	Mg^{2+} = 2.0	PO_{4} = 1
CK = 55	BE = −0.36	AG = 16
SERUM OSMOLARITY/RENAL:
PMO = 300	PCO = 295	POG = 5	BUN:Cr = 20
URINALYSIS:
UNa^{+} = 80	UCl^{−} = 100	UAG = 5	FENa = 0.95
UK^{+} = 25	USG = 1.01	UCr = 60	UO = 800
PROTEIN/GI/LIVER FUNCTION TESTS:
LDH = 100	TP = 7.6	AST = 25	TBIL = 0.7
ALP = 71	Alb = 4.0	ALT = 40	BC = 0.5
		AST/ALT = 0.6	BU = 0.2
AF alb = 3.0	SAAG = 1.0		SOG = 60
CSF:
CSF alb = 30	CSF glu = 60	CSF/S alb = 7.5	CSF/S glu = 0.6

In clinical chemistry, the urine anion gap is calculated using measured ions found in the urine. It is used to aid in the differential diagnosis of metabolic acidosis.

The term "anion gap" without qualification usually implies serum anion gap. The "urine anion gap" is a different measure, principally used to determine whether the kidneys are capable of appropriately acidifying urine.

== Calculation ==
Urine anion gap is calculated by subtracting the urine concentration of chloride (anions) from the concentrations of sodium plus potassium (cations):

$\text{UAG} = [\ce{Na+}] + [\ce{K+}] - [\ce{Cl-}]$

where the concentrations are expressed in units of milliequivalents/liter (mEq/L).

In contrast to the serum anion gap equation, the bicarbonate is excluded. This is because urine is acidic, so the bicarbonate level would be negligible.

== Uses ==
Determining the cause of a metabolic acidosis that lacks a serum anion gap often depends on determining whether the kidney is appropriately excreting acid. The urine anion gap is an 'artificial' and calculated measure that is representative of the unmeasured ions in urine. Usually the most important unmeasured ion in urine is NH_{4}^{+} since it is the most important form of acid excretion by the kidney. Urine NH_{4}^{+} is difficult to measure directly, but its excretion is usually accompanied by the anion chloride. A negative urine anion gap can be used as evidence of increased NH_{4}^{+} excretion. In a metabolic acidosis without a serum anion gap:

- A positive urine anion gap suggests a low urinary NH_{4}^{+} (e.g. renal tubular acidosis).
- A negative urine anion gap suggests a high urinary NH_{4}^{+} (e.g. diarrhea).
