= Serum-ascites albumin gradient =

Calculation used in medicine

Pathophysiology sample values
BMP/ELECTROLYTES:
Na^{+} = 140	Cl^{−} = 100	BUN = 20	/ Glu = 150 \
K^{+} = 4	CO_{2} = 22	PCr = 1.0	/ Glu = 150 \
ARTERIAL BLOOD GAS:
HCO_{3}^{−} = 24	p_{a}CO_{2} = 40	p_{a}O_{2} = 95	pH = 7.40
ALVEOLAR GAS:
	p_{A}CO_{2} = 36	p_{A}O_{2} = 105	A-a g = 10
OTHER:
Ca = 9.5	Mg^{2+} = 2.0	PO_{4} = 1
CK = 55	BE = −0.36	AG = 16
SERUM OSMOLARITY/RENAL:
PMO = 300	PCO = 295	POG = 5	BUN:Cr = 20
URINALYSIS:
UNa^{+} = 80	UCl^{−} = 100	UAG = 5	FENa = 0.95
UK^{+} = 25	USG = 1.01	UCr = 60	UO = 800
PROTEIN/GI/LIVER FUNCTION TESTS:
LDH = 100	TP = 7.6	AST = 25	TBIL = 0.7
ALP = 71	Alb = 4.0	ALT = 40	BC = 0.5
		AST/ALT = 0.6	BU = 0.2
AF alb = 3.0	SAAG = 1.0		SOG = 60
CSF:
CSF alb = 30	CSF glu = 60	CSF/S alb = 7.5	CSF/S glu = 0.6

The serum-ascites albumin gradient or gap (SAAG) is a calculation used in medicine to help determine the cause of ascites. The SAAG may be a better discriminant than the older method of classifying ascites fluid as a transudate versus exudate.

The formula is as follows:

SAAG = (serum albumin) − (albumin level of ascitic fluid).

Ideally, the two values should be measured at the same time.

This phenomenon is the result of Starling's forces between the fluid of the circulatory system and ascitic fluid. Under normal circumstances the SAAG is < 1.1g/dL (11g/L) because serum oncotic pressure (pulling fluid back into circulation) is exactly counterbalanced by the serum hydrostatic pressure (which pushes fluid out of the circulatory system). This balance is disturbed in certain diseases (such as the Budd–Chiari syndrome, heart failure, or liver cirrhosis) that increase the hydrostatic pressure in the circulatory system. The increase in hydrostatic pressure causes more fluid to leave the circulation into the peritoneal space (ascites). The SAAG subsequently increases because there is more free fluid leaving the circulation, concentrating the serum albumin. The albumin does not move across membrane spaces easily because it is a large molecule. A rare cause of ascites, with elevated SAAG, and without change in hydrostatic/osmotic pressure is urinary bladder rupture with leakage of urine into the peritoneal space.

== Differential ==
=== High gradient ===
A high gradient (> 1.1 g/dL, >11 g/L) indicates the ascites is due to portal hypertension, either liver related or non-liver related, with approximately 97% accuracy. This is due to increased hydrostatic pressure within the blood vessels of the hepatic portal system, which in turn forces water into the peritoneal cavity but leaves proteins such as albumin within the vasculature.

Important causes of high SAAG ascites (> 1.1 g/dL, >11 g/L) include: cirrhosis of the liver, heart failure, Budd–Chiari syndrome, portal vein thrombosis, and idiopathic portal fibrosis.

=== Low gradient ===
A low gradient (< 1.1 g/dL, <11 g/L) indicates causes of ascites not associated with increased portal pressure such as: tuberculosis, pancreatitis, infections, serositis, various types of peritoneal cancers (peritoneal carcinomatosis) and pulmonary infarcts.

SAAG vs Total ascites protein
		SAAG	
		<1.1 g/dL	>1.1 g/dL
Total Ascites Protein	<2.5 g/dL	Tuberculous Peritonitis, Nephrotic syndrome	Cirrhosis, Budd-Chiari (late)
Total Ascites Protein	>2.5 g/dL	Cancer, Tuberculosis, Chylous ascites, Pancreatitis	Right HF, Budd-Chiari (early), veno-occlusive disease
