= Base excess =

Excess or deficit in amount of base present in blood

- LOINC: 11555-0

In physiology, base excess and base deficit refer to an excess or deficit, respectively, in the amount of base present in the blood. The value is usually reported as a concentration in units of mEq/L (mmol/L), with positive numbers indicating an excess of base and negative a deficit. A typical reference range for base excess is −2 to +2 mEq/L.

Comparison of the base excess with the reference range assists in determining whether an acid/base disturbance is caused by a respiratory, metabolic, or mixed metabolic/respiratory problem. While carbon dioxide defines the respiratory component of acid–base balance, base excess defines the metabolic component. Accordingly, measurement of base excess is defined, under a standardized pressure of carbon dioxide, by titrating back to a standardized blood pH of 7.40.

The predominant base contributing to base excess is bicarbonate. Thus, a deviation of serum bicarbonate from the reference range is ordinarily mirrored by a deviation in base excess. However, base excess is a more comprehensive measurement, encompassing all metabolic contributions.

== Definition ==
Pathophysiology sample values
BMP/ELECTROLYTES:
Na^{+} = 140	Cl^{−} = 100	BUN = 20	/ Glu = 150 \
K^{+} = 4	CO_{2} = 22	PCr = 1.0	/ Glu = 150 \
ARTERIAL BLOOD GAS:
HCO_{3}^{−} = 24	p_{a}CO_{2} = 40	p_{a}O_{2} = 95	pH = 7.40
ALVEOLAR GAS:
	p_{A}CO_{2} = 36	p_{A}O_{2} = 105	A-a g = 10
OTHER:
Ca = 9.5	Mg^{2+} = 2.0	PO_{4} = 1
CK = 55	BE = −0.36	AG = 16
SERUM OSMOLARITY/RENAL:
PMO = 300	PCO = 295	POG = 5	BUN:Cr = 20
URINALYSIS:
UNa^{+} = 80	UCl^{−} = 100	UAG = 5	FENa = 0.95
UK^{+} = 25	USG = 1.01	UCr = 60	UO = 800
PROTEIN/GI/LIVER FUNCTION TESTS:
LDH = 100	TP = 7.6	AST = 25	TBIL = 0.7
ALP = 71	Alb = 4.0	ALT = 40	BC = 0.5
		AST/ALT = 0.6	BU = 0.2
AF alb = 3.0	SAAG = 1.0		SOG = 60
CSF:
CSF alb = 30	CSF glu = 60	CSF/S alb = 7.5	CSF/S glu = 0.6

Base excess is defined as the amount of strong acid that must be added to each liter of fully oxygenated blood to return the pH to 7.40 at a temperature of 37°C and a pCO_{2} of 40 mmHg (5.3 kPa). A base deficit (i.e., a negative base excess) can be correspondingly defined by the amount of strong base that must be added.

A further distinction can be made between actual and standard base excess: actual base excess is that present in the blood, while standard base excess is the value when the hemoglobin is at 5 g/dl. The latter gives a better view of the base excess of the entire extracellular fluid.

Base excess (or deficit) is one of several values typically reported with arterial blood gas analysis that is derived from other measured data.

The term and concept of base excess were first introduced by Poul Astrup and Ole Siggaard-Andersen in 1958.

== Estimation ==
Base excess can be estimated from the bicarbonate concentration ([HCO_{3}^{−}]) and pH by the equation:

$Base~excess = 0.93 \times \left ( \left [ HCO_3^- \right ] - 24.4 + 14.8 \times \left ( pH - 7.4 \right ) \right )$

with units of mEq/L. The same can be alternatively expressed as

$Base~excess = 0.93 \times [HCO_3^-] + 13.77 \times pH - 124.58$

Calculations are based on the Henderson-Hasselbalch equation:

$$pH = pK + log \frac{[HCO_3^-]}{[CO_2]}$$

Ultimately the end result is:

$$BE = 0.02786 \times PaCO_2 \times 10^{(pH - 6.1)} + 13.77 \times pH - 124.58$$

== Interpretation ==
Base excess beyond the reference range indicates

- metabolic alkalosis, or respiratory acidosis with renal compensation if too high (more than +2 mEq/L)
- metabolic acidosis, or respiratory alkalosis with renal compensation if too low (less than −2 mEq/L)

Blood pH is determined by both a metabolic component, measured by base excess, and a respiratory component, measured by PaCO_{2} (partial pressure of carbon dioxide). Often a disturbance in one triggers a partial compensation in the other. A secondary (compensatory) process can be readily identified because it opposes the observed deviation in blood pH.

For example, inadequate ventilation, a respiratory problem, causes a buildup of CO_{2}, hence respiratory acidosis; the kidneys then attempt to compensate for the low pH by raising blood bicarbonate. The kidneys only partially compensate, so the patient may still have a low blood pH, i.e. acidemia. In summary, the kidneys partially compensate for respiratory acidosis by raising blood bicarbonate.

A high base excess, thus metabolic alkalosis, usually involves an excess of bicarbonate. It can be caused by

- Compensation for primary respiratory acidosis
- Excessive loss of HCl in gastric acid by vomiting
- Renal overproduction of bicarbonate, in either contraction alkalosis or Cushing's disease

A base deficit (a below-normal base excess), thus metabolic acidosis, usually involves either excretion of bicarbonate or neutralization of bicarbonate by excess organic acids. Common causes include

- Compensation for primary respiratory alkalosis
- Diabetic ketoacidosis, in which high levels of acidic ketone bodies are produced
- Lactic acidosis, due to anaerobic metabolism during heavy exercise or hypoxia
- Chronic kidney failure, preventing excretion of acid and resorption and production of bicarbonate
- Diarrhea, in which large amounts of bicarbonate are excreted
- Ingestion of poisons such as methanol, ethylene glycol, or excessive aspirin

The serum anion gap is useful for determining whether a base deficit is caused by addition of acid or loss of bicarbonate.

- Base deficit with elevated anion gap indicates addition of acid (e.g., ketoacidosis).
- Base deficit with normal anion gap indicates loss of bicarbonate (e.g., diarrhea). The anion gap is maintained because bicarbonate is exchanged for chloride during excretion.

== See ==
- Acid–base homeostasis
- Metabolic acidosis / Metabolic alkalosis
- Arterial blood gas
