= CSF albumin =

- LOINC: 1746-7 (MCnc); 2861-3 (MCnc, electrophoresis); 43711-1 (ACnc)

CSF albumin is a measurement used to determine the levels of albumin in cerebrospinal fluid.

A closely related test, CSF total protein is a measurement used to determine the levels of protein in cerebrospinal fluid. It combines the albumin, IgG, and other proteins.

It can be useful in distinguishing among causes of Meningitis. It is more likely to be elevated in bacterial meningitis than in viral meningitis.

The upper normal range is 150 mg/dl in neonates, and 50 mg/dl in adults.

Pathophysiology sample values
BMP/ELECTROLYTES:
Na^{+} = 140	Cl^{−} = 100	BUN = 20	/ Glu = 150 \
K^{+} = 4	CO_{2} = 22	PCr = 1.0	/ Glu = 150 \
ARTERIAL BLOOD GAS:
HCO_{3}^{−} = 24	p_{a}CO_{2} = 40	p_{a}O_{2} = 95	pH = 7.40
ALVEOLAR GAS:
	p_{A}CO_{2} = 36	p_{A}O_{2} = 105	A-a g = 10
OTHER:
Ca = 9.5	Mg^{2+} = 2.0	PO_{4} = 1
CK = 55	BE = −0.36	AG = 16
SERUM OSMOLARITY/RENAL:
PMO = 300	PCO = 295	POG = 5	BUN:Cr = 20
URINALYSIS:
UNa^{+} = 80	UCl^{−} = 100	UAG = 5	FENa = 0.95
UK^{+} = 25	USG = 1.01	UCr = 60	UO = 800
PROTEIN/GI/LIVER FUNCTION TESTS:
LDH = 100	TP = 7.6	AST = 25	TBIL = 0.7
ALP = 71	Alb = 4.0	ALT = 40	BC = 0.5
		AST/ALT = 0.6	BU = 0.2
AF alb = 3.0	SAAG = 1.0		SOG = 60
CSF:
CSF alb = 30	CSF glu = 60	CSF/S alb = 7.5	CSF/S glu = 0.6
