= Osmol gap =

Difference between measured and calculated blood serum osmolality

Serum osmotic gap
- Synonyms: osmolal gap, osmolality gap, osmolar gap osmole gap
- LOINC: 33264-3

In clinical chemistry, the osmol gap is the difference between measured blood serum osmolality and calculated serum osmolality.

== Calculation ==
The osmol gap is typically calculated with the following formula (all values in mmol/L):

$$\begin{align}
\text{OG} &= \text{measured serum osmolality} - \text{calculated osmolality} \\[4pt]
&= \text{measured serum osmolality} - \Bigl( 2 \times [\ce{Na^+}] + [\ce{glucose}] + [\ce{urea}] \Bigr)
\end{align}$$

In non-SI laboratory units: Calculated osmolality = 2 x [Na mmol/L] + [glucose mg/dL] / 18 + [BUN mg/dL] / 2.8 + [ethanol/3.7] (note: the values 18 and 2.8 convert mg/dL into mmol/L; the molecular weight of ethanol is 46, but empiric data shows that it does not act as an ideal osmole in solution and the appropriate divisor is 3.7)

A normal osmol gap is < 10 mOsm/kg .

=== Explanation of units ===
Since laboratories measure serum solutes in terms of freezing point depression, the reported units are properly units of osmolality. When a measure of serum solutes is calculated, it is often done in units of osmolarity. While it is possible to convert between osmolality and osmolarity, thereby deriving a more mathematically correct osmol gap calculation, in actual clinical practice this is not done. This is because the difference in absolute value of these two measurements that can be attributed to the difference in units will be negligible in a clinical setting. For this reason, the terms are often used interchangeably, though some object to equating the terms. Because the calculated osmol gap can therefore be a conflation of both terms (depending on how it is derived), neither term (osmolal gap nor osmolar gap) may be semantically correct. To avoid ambiguity, the terms "osmolal" and "osmolar" can be used when the units of molality or molarity are consistent throughout the calculation. When this is not the case, the term "osmol gap" can be used when units are mixed to provide a clinical estimate.

== Causes ==
Osmol gaps are used as a screening tool to identify toxins.

Causes of an elevated osmol gap are numerous. Generally there are 4 main causes:

- alcohols
- sugars
- lipids
- proteins

All four are osmotically active substances found in humans. Accordingly, intoxications as listed below are reasons for an increased osmolar gap.

Alcohols

- ethanol intoxication
- methanol ingestion
- ethylene glycol ingestion
- isopropyl alcohol ingestion
- propylene glycol toxicity (as with intravenous infusions where it is used as an excipient, e.g. lorazepam)
- acetone ingestion (not an alcohol)

Sugars

- mannitol
- sorbitol

Lipids

- Hypertriglyceridemia

Proteins

- Hypergammaglobinemia (M. Waldenström)

== Theory ==
Pathophysiology sample values
BMP/ELECTROLYTES:
Na^{+} = 140	Cl^{−} = 100	BUN = 20	/ Glu = 150 \
K^{+} = 4	CO_{2} = 22	PCr = 1.0	/ Glu = 150 \
ARTERIAL BLOOD GAS:
HCO_{3}^{−} = 24	p_{a}CO_{2} = 40	p_{a}O_{2} = 95	pH = 7.40
ALVEOLAR GAS:
	p_{A}CO_{2} = 36	p_{A}O_{2} = 105	A-a g = 10
OTHER:
Ca = 9.5	Mg^{2+} = 2.0	PO_{4} = 1
CK = 55	BE = −0.36	AG = 16
SERUM OSMOLARITY/RENAL:
PMO = 300	PCO = 295	POG = 5	BUN:Cr = 20
URINALYSIS:
UNa^{+} = 80	UCl^{−} = 100	UAG = 5	FENa = 0.95
UK^{+} = 25	USG = 1.01	UCr = 60	UO = 800
PROTEIN/GI/LIVER FUNCTION TESTS:
LDH = 100	TP = 7.6	AST = 25	TBIL = 0.7
ALP = 71	Alb = 4.0	ALT = 40	BC = 0.5
		AST/ALT = 0.6	BU = 0.2
AF alb = 3.0	SAAG = 1.0		SOG = 60
CSF:
CSF alb = 30	CSF glu = 60	CSF/S alb = 7.5	CSF/S glu = 0.6

There are a variety of ions and molecules dissolved in the serum. The major constitutionals of clinical importance are sodium ions, glucose, and blood urea nitrogen (BUN), plus ethyl alcohol in a person who has been drinking. As part of a laboratory blood test, a vial of blood is tested for the amount of these four ions and molecules that are present in the blood. From this measurement, the clinician can calculate the plasma osmolality of a patient's blood. A second vial is also sent to the laboratory. This vial is put in an instrument that measures the freezing point depression of all the solutes in the plasma. This measurement gives the true plasma osmolality. The calculated osmolality is then subtracted from the measured osmolality to provide the osmol gap, or the difference between these two values. If this gap falls within an acceptable range,(<10) then it is assumed that sodium, glucose, BUN are indeed the major dissolved ions and molecules in the serum. If, however, the calculated gap is above an acceptable range, then it is an indication that there is something else dissolved in the serum that is producing an osmol gap, which can be a major clue in determining what is ailing the patient.

== See also ==
- Osmolality
- Metabolic acidosis
- Anion gap
- High anion gap metabolic acidosis
