= Urea-to-creatinine ratio =

Medical laboratory value

urea-to-creatinine ratio
- LOINC: 44734-2, 3097-3

In medicine, the urea-to-creatinine ratio (UCR), known in the United States as BUN-to-creatinine ratio, is the ratio of the blood levels of urea (BUN) (mmol/L) and creatinine (Cr) (μmol/L). BUN only reflects the nitrogen content of urea (MW 28), while urea measurement reflects the whole of the molecule (MW 60); urea is just over twice BUN (60/28 = 2.14). In the United States, both quantities are given in mg/dL. The ratio may be used to determine the cause of acute kidney injury or dehydration.

The principle behind this ratio is the fact that both urea (BUN) and creatinine are freely filtered by the glomerulus; however, urea reabsorbed by the renal tubules can be regulated (increased or decreased) whereas creatinine reabsorption remains the same (minimal reabsorption).

== Definition ==
Urea and creatinine are nitrogenous end products of metabolism. Urea is the primary metabolite derived from dietary protein and tissue protein turnover. Creatinine is the product of muscle creatine catabolism. Both are relatively small molecules (60 and 113 daltons, respectively) that distribute throughout total body water. In Europe, the whole urea molecule is assayed, whereas in the United States only the nitrogen component of urea (the blood or serum urea nitrogen, i.e., BUN or SUN) is measured. The BUN, then, is roughly one-half (7/15 or 0.466) of the blood urea.

The normal range of urea nitrogen in blood or serum is 5 to 20 mg/dl, or 1.8 to 7.1 mmol urea per liter. The range is wide because of normal variations due to protein intake, endogenous protein catabolism, state of hydration, hepatic urea synthesis, and renal urea excretion. A BUN of 15 mg/dl would represent significantly impaired function for a woman in the thirtieth week of gestation. Her higher glomerular filtration rate (GFR), expanded extracellular fluid volume, and anabolism in the developing fetus contribute to her relatively low BUN of 5 to 7 mg/dl. In contrast, the rugged rancher who eats in excess of 125 g protein each day may have a normal BUN of 20 mg/dl.

The normal serum creatinine (sCr) varies with the subject's body muscle mass and with the technique used to measure it. For the adult male, the normal range is 0.6 to 1.2 mg/dl, or 53 to 106 μmol/L by the kinetic or enzymatic method, and 0.8 to 1.5 mg/dl, or 70 to 133 μmol/L by the older manual Jaffé reaction. For the adult female, with her generally lower muscle mass, the normal range is 0.5 to 1.1 mg/dl, or 44 to 97 μmol/L by the enzymatic method.

== Technique ==
Multiple methods for analysis of BUN and creatinine have evolved over the years. Most of those in current use are automated and give clinically reliable and reproducible results.

There are two general methods for the measurement of urea nitrogen. The diacetyl, or Fearon, reaction develops a yellow chromogen with urea, and this is quantified by photometry. It has been modified for use in autoanalyzers and generally gives relatively accurate results. It still has limited specificity, however, as illustrated by spurious elevations with sulfonylurea compounds, and by colorimetric interference from hemoglobin when whole blood is used.

In the more specific enzymatic methods, the enzyme urease converts urea to ammonia and carbonic acid. These products, which are proportional to the concentration of urea in the sample, are assayed in a variety of systems, some of which are automated. One system checks the decrease in absorbance at 340 nm when the ammonia reacts with alpha-ketoglutaric acid. The Astra system measures the rate of increase in conductivity of the solution in which urea is hydrolyzed.

Even though the test is now performed mostly on serum, the term BUN is still retained by convention. The specimen should not be collected in tubes containing sodium fluoride because the fluoride inhibits urease. Also chloral hydrate and guanethidine have been observed to increase BUN values.

The 1886 Jaffé reaction, in which creatinine is treated with an alkaline picrate solution to yield a red complex, is still the basis of most commonly used methods for measuring creatinine. This reaction is nonspecific and subject to interference from many noncreatinine chromogens, including acetone, acetoacetate, pyruvate, ascorbic acid, glucose, cephalosporins, barbiturates, and protein. It is also sensitive to pH and temperature changes. One or another of the many modifications designed to nullify these sources of error is used in most clinical laboratories today. For example, the recent kinetic-rate modification, which isolates the brief time interval during which only true creatinine contributes to total color formation, is the basis of the Astra modular system.

More specific, non-Jaffé assays have also been developed. One of these, an automated dry-slide enzymatic method, measures ammonia generated when creatinine is hydrolyzed by creatinine iminohydrolase. Its simplicity, precision, and speed highly recommend it for routine use in the clinical laboratory. Only 5-fluorocytosine interferes significantly with the test.

Creatinine must be determined in plasma or serum and not whole blood because erythrocytes contain considerable amounts of noncreatinine chromogens. To minimize the conversion of creatine to creatinine, specimens must be as fresh as possible and maintained at pH 7 during storage.

The amount of urea produced varies with substrate delivery to the liver and the adequacy of liver function. It is increased by a high-protein diet, by gastrointestinal bleeding (based on plasma protein level of 7.5 g/dl and a hemoglobin of 15 g/dl, 500 ml of whole blood is equivalent to 100 g protein), by catabolic processes such as fever or infection, and by antianabolic drugs such as tetracyclines (except doxycycline) or glucocorticoids. It is decreased by low-protein diet, malnutrition or starvation, and by impaired metabolic activity in the liver due to parenchymal liver disease or, rarely, to congenital deficiency of urea cycle enzymes. The normal subject on a 70 g protein diet produces about 12 g of urea each day.

This newly synthesized urea distributes throughout total body water. Some of it is recycled through the enterohepatic circulation. Usually, a small amount (less than 0.5 g/day) is lost through the gastrointestinal tract, lungs, and skin; during exercise, a substantial fraction may be excreted in sweat. The bulk of the urea, about 10 g each day, is excreted by the kidney in a process that begins with glomerular filtration. At high urine flow rates (greater than 2 ml/min), 40% of the filtered load is reabsorbed, and at flow rates lower than 2 ml/min, reabsorption may increase to 60%. Low flow, as in urinary tract obstruction, allows more time for reabsorption and is often associated with increases in antidiuretic hormone (ADH), which increases the permeability of the terminal collecting tubule to urea. During ADH-induced antidiuresis, urea secretion contributes to the intratubular concentration of urea. The subsequent buildup of urea in the inner medulla is critical to the process of urinary concentration. Reabsorption is also increased by volume contraction, reduced renal plasma flow as in congestive heart failure, and decreased glomerular filtration.

Creatinine formation begins with the transamidination from arginine to glycine to form glycocyamine or guanidoacetic acid (GAA). This reaction occurs primarily in the kidneys, but also in the mucosa of the small intestine and the pancreas. The GAA is transported to the liver where it is methylated by S-adenosyl methionine (SAM) to form creatine. Creatine enters the circulation, and 90% of it is taken up and stored by muscle tissue.

== Interpretation ==
Pathophysiology sample values
BMP/ELECTROLYTES:
Na^{+} = 140	Cl^{−} = 100	BUN = 20	/ Glu = 150 \
K^{+} = 4	CO_{2} = 22	PCr = 1.0	/ Glu = 150 \
ARTERIAL BLOOD GAS:
HCO_{3}^{−} = 24	p_{a}CO_{2} = 40	p_{a}O_{2} = 95	pH = 7.40
ALVEOLAR GAS:
	p_{A}CO_{2} = 36	p_{A}O_{2} = 105	A-a g = 10
OTHER:
Ca = 9.5	Mg^{2+} = 2.0	PO_{4} = 1
CK = 55	BE = −0.36	AG = 16
SERUM OSMOLARITY/RENAL:
PMO = 300	PCO = 295	POG = 5	BUN:Cr = 20
URINALYSIS:
UNa^{+} = 80	UCl^{−} = 100	UAG = 5	FENa = 0.95
UK^{+} = 25	USG = 1.01	UCr = 60	UO = 800
PROTEIN/GI/LIVER FUNCTION TESTS:
LDH = 100	TP = 7.6	AST = 25	TBIL = 0.7
ALP = 71	Alb = 4.0	ALT = 40	BC = 0.5
		AST/ALT = 0.6	BU = 0.2
AF alb = 3.0	SAAG = 1.0		SOG = 60
CSF:
CSF alb = 30	CSF glu = 60	CSF/S alb = 7.5	CSF/S glu = 0.6

Normal serum values

Test	SI	U.S.
BUN (Urea)		7–20 mg/dL
Urea	3.0–8.0 mmol/L	20–40 mg/dL
Creatinine	62–106 μmol/L	0.7–1.2 mg/dL

Serum ratios

BUN:Cr (U.S.)	Urea:Cr (SI)	Location	Mechanism
>20:1	>110:1	Prerenal (before the kidney)	BUN reabsorption is increased. BUN is disproportionately elevated relative to creatinine in serum. This may be indicative of hypoperfusion of the kidneys due to heart failure or dehydration. Gastrointestinal bleeding or increased dietary protein can also increase the ratio.
12–20:1	40–110:1	Normal or Postrenal (after the kidney)	Normal range. Can also be postrenal disease. BUN reabsorption is within normal limits.
<12:1	<40:1	Intrarenal (within kidney)	Renal damage causes reduced reabsorption of BUN, therefore lowering the BUN:Cr ratio. Decreased ratio indicates liver disease (due to decreased urea formation) or malnutrition.

The reference interval for normal BUN/creatinine serum ratio is 12 : 1 to 20 : 1.

An elevated BUN:Cr due to a low or low-normal creatinine and a BUN within the reference range is unlikely to be of clinical significance.

== Specific causes of elevation ==
=== Acute kidney injury (previously termed acute renal failure) ===
The ratio is predictive of prerenal injury when BUN:Cr exceeds 20 or when urea:Cr exceeds 100. In prerenal injury, urea increases disproportionately to creatinine due to enhanced proximal tubular reabsorption that follows the enhanced transport of sodium and water.

=== Gastrointestinal bleeding ===
The ratio is useful for the diagnosis of bleeding from the gastrointestinal (GI) tract in patients who do not present with overt vomiting of blood. In children, a BUN:Cr ratio of 30 or greater has a sensitivity of 68.8% and a specificity of 98% for upper gastrointestinal bleeding.

A common assumption is that the ratio is elevated because of amino acid digestion, since blood (excluding water) consists largely of the protein hemoglobin and is broken down by digestive enzymes of the upper GI tract into amino acids, which are then reabsorbed in the GI tract and broken down into urea. However, elevated BUN:Cr ratios are not observed when other high protein loads (e.g., steak) are consumed. Renal hypoperfusion secondary to the blood lost from the GI bleed has been postulated to explain the elevated BUN:Cr ratio. However, other research has found that renal hypoperfusion cannot fully explain the elevation.

=== Advanced age ===
Because of decreased muscle mass, elderly patients may have an elevated BUN:Cr at baseline.

=== Other causes ===
Hypercatabolic states, high-dose glucocorticoids, and resorption of large hematomas have all been cited as causes of a disproportionate rise in BUN relative to the creatinine.
