= Arterial gas =

Arterial gas may refer to:

- Physiologic arterial blood gas
- Air embolism
