= UUN =

UUN, Uun, or uun can refer to:

- Urine urea nitrogen, a medical test that measures urea in urine
- Another name for darmstadtium, a transactinide chemical element
- Baruun-Urt Airport, an airport located in Baruun-Urt, Mongolia, by IATA code
- Pazeh language, an extinct language formerly spoken in Taiwan, by ISO 639 code
- "Universal User Name"; see List of computing and IT abbreviations
