= Ole Siggaard-Andersen =

Danish physician clinical chemist (born 1932)

- Born: 10 December 1932 (age 92)
- Known for: Acid-base theory
- Scientific career
- Fields: Medicine, physiology

Ole Siggaard-Andersen (born 10 December 1932) is a Danish physician clinical chemist who elucidated much acid base physiology. He jointly invented the concepts of base excess and standard base excess.

His doctoral thesis, The Acid-Base Status of the Blood, was published as a book for five editions and in five languages. He was honored by the American Association for Clinical Chemistry who awarded him the Edwin F. Ullman Award in 2003.
