= Hemoximetry =

Hemoximetry is the monitoring of hemoglobin and oxygen saturation, especially during procedures such as cardiac catheterization.

Hemoximetry presents hemoglobin oxygen saturation, dyshemoglobines, and total hemoglobin concentration data. The functional oxygen saturation measured by this procedure is the basis for calibrating pulse oximeters. Pulse oximeters cannot be calibrated using physical procedures, but only by directly comparing the reported measurements and the parallel arterial oxygen saturation measured by hemoximetry in a group of healthy subjects.
