= Urine urea nitrogen =

- Purpose: assess nitrogen balance

Urine urea nitrogen (UUN) refers to a test that measures the urine urea to assess nitrogen balance.

== Chemical structure ==
Urea nitrogen is the end product of breakdown of proteins in the body. In individuals with normal kidney and liver functions, urea is excreted via urine.

== Indication for testing ==
By testing for UUN, clinicians can assess one's nitrogen balance. Calculating nitrogen balance is a useful tool in assessing adequacy of protein provision in clinical setting in:

- Patients with questionable protein intake.
- Patients with confirmed or suspected protein digestion and absorption problems.
- Patients with increased metabolic demand due to catabolic disease status.
- Patients on long-term enteral nutrition or parenteral nutrition.

== Calculation of nitrogen balance ==
UUN is determined from 24-hour urine collection. Along with UUN, values for BUN, protein content of diet, enteral or parenteral nutrition, and notable outputs other than urine (gastric residual, fistula output, drainages) are needed to calculate nitrogen balance. Nitrogen Balance = Protein intake/6.25- (UN + 4*) * For average loss via sweat and feces.

== Interpretations ==
- Nitrogen balance value of 0 indicates maintenance.
- If nitrogen balance is negative, nutrition intervention should address increased protein provision until equilibrium achieved.

== When test is not appropriate ==
As UUN test is based on 24-hour urine, in individuals with kidney disease with less than 1000 ml urine out/day or on dialysis, this test cannot be applied.

== See also ==
- Blood urea nitrogen
