= Plasma osmolality =

Blood test

Plasma osmolality measures the body's electrolyte–water balance. There are several methods for arriving at this quantity through measurement or calculation.

Osmolality and osmolarity are measures that are technically different, but functionally the same for normal use. Whereas osmolality (with an "l") is defined as the number of osmoles (Osm) of solute per kilogram of solvent (osmol/kg or Osm/kg), osmolarity (with an "r") is defined as the number of osmoles of solute per liter (L) of solution (osmol/L or Osm/L). As such, larger numbers indicate a greater concentration of solutes in the plasma.

== Measured osmolality (MO) ==
Osmolality can be measured on an analytical instrument called an osmometer. It works on the method of depression of freezing point.

== Osmolality versus osmolarity ==
Osmolarity is affected by changes in water content, as well as temperature and pressure. In contrast, osmolality is independent of temperature and pressure. For a given solution, osmolarity is slightly less than osmolality, because the total solvent weight (the divisor used for osmolality) excludes the weight of any solutes, whereas the total solution volume (used for osmolarity) includes solute content. Otherwise, one litre of plasma would be equivalent to one kilogram of plasma, and plasma osmolarity and plasma osmolality would be equal. However, at low concentrations (below about 500 mM), the mass of the solute is negligible compared to the mass of the solvent, and osmolarity and osmolality are very similar.

Technically, the terms can be compared as follows:

Origin	Source	Appropriate term	Units
clinical laboratories	osmometer (freezing point depression osmometer, or vapor pressure depression osmometer)	osmolality	mOsm/kg
bedside calculations	derived from lab data that were measured in solutions (Na, Glu, Urea)	osmolarity	mOsm/L

Therefore, bedside calculations are actually in units of osmolarity, whereas laboratory measurements will provide readings in units of osmolality. In practice, there is almost negligible difference between the absolute values of the different measurements. For this reason, both terms are often used interchangeably, even though they refer to different units of measurement.

== Ranges ==
=== Human ===
Normal human reference range of osmolality in plasma is about 275-299 milli-osmoles per kilogram.

=== Nonhuman ===
Plasma osmolarity of some reptiles, especial those from a freshwater aquatic environment, may be lower than that of mammals (e.g. < 260 mOsm/L) during favourable conditions. Consequently, solutions osmotically balanced for mammals (e.g., 0.9% normal saline) are likely to be mildly hypertonic for such animals. Many arid species of reptiles and hibernating uricotelic species allow major elevations of plasma osmolarity (e.g. > 400 mOsm/L) that could be fatal to some mammals.

Deep-sea fish have adapted to the extreme hydrostatic pressures of depth through a number of factors, including increasing osmolality, with one of the deepest known fish in the world, the hadal snailfish (Notoliparis kermadecensis) having a recorded muscle osmolality of 991 ± 22 mOsmol/kg, almost four times the osmolality of mammals and three times that of shallow water fish species (typically 350 mOsmol/kg).

=== Clinical relevance ===
As cell membranes in general are freely permeable to water, the osmolality of the extracellular fluid (ECF) is approximately equal to that of the intracellular fluid (ICF). Therefore, plasma osmolality is a guide to intracellular osmolality. This is important, as it shows that changes in ECF osmolality have a great effect on ICF osmolality — changes that can cause problems with normal cell functioning and volume. If the ECF were to become too hypotonic, water would readily fill surrounding cells, increasing their volume and potentially lysing them (cytolysis). Many poisons, medications and diseases affect the balance between the ICF and ECF, affecting individual cells and homeostasis as a whole.

Osmolality of blood increases with dehydration and decreases with overhydration. In normal people, increased osmolality in the blood will stimulate secretion of antidiuretic hormone (ADH). This will result in increased water reabsorption, more concentrated urine, and less concentrated blood plasma. A low serum osmolality will suppress the release of ADH, resulting in decreased water reabsorption and more concentrated plasma.

Syndrome of inappropriate ADH secretion occurs when excessive release of antidiuretic hormone results in inappropriately elevated urine osmolality (>100 mOsmol/L) relative to the blood plasma, leading to hyponatraemia. This ADH secretion may occur in excessive amounts from the posterior pituitary gland, or from ectopic sources such as small-cell carcinoma of the lung.

Elevation may be associated with stroke mortality.

== Calculated osmolarity (CO) ==
In medical lab reports, this quantity often appears as "Osmo, Calc" or "Osmo (Calc)." According to the international SI unit use the following equation :

Calculated osmolarity = 2 Na + Glucose + Urea (all in mmol/L)

As Na+ is the major extracellular cation, the sum of osmolarity of all other anions can be assumed to be equal to natremia, hence [Na+]x2 ≈ [Na+] + [anions]

To calculate plasma osmolality use the following equation (typical in the US):

- = 2[Na^{+}] + [Glucose]/18 + [ BUN ]/2.8 where [Glucose] and [BUN] are measured in mg/dL.

If the patient has ingested ethanol, the ethanol level should be included in the calculated osmolarity:

- = 2[Na^{+}] + [Glucose]/18 + [ BUN ]/2.8 + [Ethanol]/3.7

Based on the molecular weight of ethanol the divisor should be 4.6 but empiric data shows that ethanol does not behave as an ideal osmole.

== Osmolar gap (OG) ==
The osmolar gap is the difference between the measured osmolality and the calculated osmolarity. The difference in units is attributed to the difference in the way that blood solutes are measured in the laboratory versus the way they are calculated. The laboratory value measures the freezing point depression, properly called osmolality while the calculated value is given in units of osmolarity. Even though these values are presented in different units, when there is a small amount of solute compared to total volume of solution, the absolute values of osmolality vs. osmolarity are very close. Often, this results in confusion as to which units are meant. For practical purposes, the units are considered interchangeable. The resulting "osmolar gap" can be thought of as either osmolar or osmolal, since both units have been used in its derivation.

Measured osmolality is abbreviated "MO", calculated osmolarity is abbreviated "CO", and the osmolality gap is abbreviated "OG".

Clinically, the osmolar gap is used to detect the presence of an osmotically active particle that is not normally found in plasma, usually a toxic alcohol such as ethanol, methanol or isopropyl alcohol.

== See also ==
- Osmotic concentration
- Urine osmolality
- Serum Osmolarity vs. Osmolality
