= Renal sodium reabsorption =

Reabsorption of filtered sodium ions within the kidneys

In renal physiology, renal sodium reabsorption refers to the process by which the kidneys, having filtered out waste products from the blood to be excreted as urine, re-absorb sodium ions (Na^{+}) from the waste. It uses Na-H antiport, Na-glucose symport, sodium ion channels (minor). It is stimulated by angiotensin II and aldosterone, and inhibited by atrial natriuretic peptide.

It is very efficient, since more than 25,000 mmol/day of sodium is filtered into the nephron, but only ~100 mmol/day, or less than 0.4% remains in the final urine.

== Proximal tubule ==
Most of the reabsorption (65%) occurs in the proximal tubule. In the latter part it is favored by an electrochemical driving force, but initially it needs the cotransporter SGLT and the Na-H antiporter. Sodium passes along an electrochemical gradient (passive transport) from the lumen into the tubular cell, together with water and chloride which also diffuse passively. Water is reabsorbed to the same degree, resulting in the concentration in the end of the proximal tubule being the same as in the beginning. In other words, the reabsorption in the proximal tubule is isosmotic.

== Loop of Henle ==
Sodium is reabsorbed in the thick ascending limb of loop of Henle, by Na-K-2Cl symporter and Na-H antiporter. It goes against its chemical driving force, but the high electrical driving force renders the overall electrochemical driving force positive anyway, availing some sodium to diffuse passively either the transcellular or paracellular way.

== Distal tubule ==
In the distal convoluted tubule sodium is transported against an electrochemical gradient by sodium-chloride symporters.

== Collecting duct ==
The principal cells are the sodium-transporting cells in the collecting duct system.

=== Regulation ===
Although only a fragment of total reabsorption happens here, it is the main part of intervention. This is e.g. done by endogenous production of aldosterone, increasing reabsorption. Since the normal excretion rate of sodium is ~100mmoles/day, then a regulation of the absorption of still more than 1000 mmoles/day entering the collecting duct system has a substantial influence of the total sodium excreted.

== Overview table ==
Characteristics of Na^{+} reabsorption
Characteristic	Proximal tubule			Loop of Henle			Distal convoluted tubule	Collecting duct system			
Characteristic	S1	S2	S3	Descending limb	Thin ascending limb	Thick ascending limb	Distal convoluted tubule	Connecting tubule	Initial collecting tubule	Cortical collecting ducts	Medullary collecting ducts
Reabsorption (%)	67%					25%	5%				3%
Reabsorption (mmol/day)	~17,000					~6,400	~1,300				~700
Concentration (mM)	142		142			100	70			40	
Electrical driving force (mV)	-3		+3			+15	-5 to +5			-40	
Chemical driving force (mV)	0		0			-9	-19			-34	
Electrochemical driving force (mV)	-3		+3			+6	-24 to -14			-74	
Apical transport proteins	SGLT, Na-H antiporter				(Passively)	Na-K-2Cl symporter (Na-H antiporter and passively)	Sodium-chloride symporter			ENaC	
Basolateral transport proteins	Na^{+}/K^{+}-ATPase										
Other reabsorption features	Isosmotic							Principal cells, stimulated by aldosterone			
