= CSF/serum albumin ratio =

- LOINC: 1756-6

CSF/serum albumin ratio is a test performed to compare the levels of albumin in the cerebrospinal fluid and the serum.

It is useful as a measure of the integrity of the blood–brain barrier.
