= Iron tests =

- Purpose: evaluate iron level

Iron tests are groups of clinical chemistry laboratory blood tests that are used to evaluate body iron stores or the iron level in blood serum.

Other terms used for the same tests are iron panel, iron profile, iron indices, iron status or iron studies.

== Tests ==
- Serum iron
- Serum ferritin
- Serum transferrin
- Total iron-binding capacity (TIBC)
- Transferrin saturation
- Unsaturated iron-binding capacity (UIBC)
- Transferrin receptor (TfR)

== Related tests ==
- Complete blood count (CBC), especially:
  - Hemoglobin, EVF or total red blood cells (RBC count)
  - Mean corpuscular volume (MCV)
  - Mean corpuscular hemoglobin (MCH) or MCHC

== Diagnosis ==
| IRON PANEL | Serum iron | Serum transferrin | TIBC | Transferrin saturation | Serum ferritin | Transferrin receptor |
|---|---|---|---|---|---|---|
| Iron deficiency anemia | | | | | | |
| Iron overload (hemochromatosis) | | | | | | / |
| Anemia of chronic disease | | | | | / | / |
| Porphyria cutanea tarda (PCT) | | | | | | |
| Thalassemia | | | | | | |
| Sideroblastic anemia | | | | | | / |
| Megaloblastic anemia | | | | | | |
| Hemolytic anemia | / | / | / | / | / | |
| Pregnancy or use of hormonal contraception | | | | | [data missing] | [data missing] |

== See also ==
- Reference ranges for blood tests § Ions and trace metals, for reference ranges for tests above
