= Soluble transferrin receptor =

Soluble transferrin receptor conventionally refers to the cleaved extracellular portion of transferrin receptor 1 that is released into serum. This receptor is a protein dimer of two identical subunits, linked together by two pairs of disulfide bonds. Its molecular mass 190,000 Dalton.

Blood testing of the soluble transferrin receptor (sTfR) is used as a measure of functional iron status and the investigation of iron deficiency anemia. Ferritin, a routine investigation for anemia, is an acute-phase reactant, and may be elevated in states of inflammation, thereby falsely indicating that iron stores are adequate. Because sTfR is insensitive to inflammation, it can detect anemia in patients with preexisting inflammatory states, and is particularly useful in distinguishing between the anemia of chronic disease and anemias caused by lack of iron intake.

To date, the conventionally identified soluble transferrin receptor has not been itself implicated in intracellular delivery of transferrin and associated iron stores.

A soluble receptor for any ligand could also refer to a molecule present is solution (for example a secretory protein) which would bind with the target ligand and then effect cellular delivery. In this context the multifunctional glycolytic enzyme glyceraldehyde-3-phosphate dehydrogenase (GAPDH) has been reported as a soluble receptor for transferrin. It has been demonstrated to deliver more transferrin as compared to the receptors anchored on the cells surface in numerous cell types.

== See also ==
- Ferritin
- Transferrin
- Total iron binding capacity
