= HFE (gene) =

Mammalian protein found in Homo sapiens

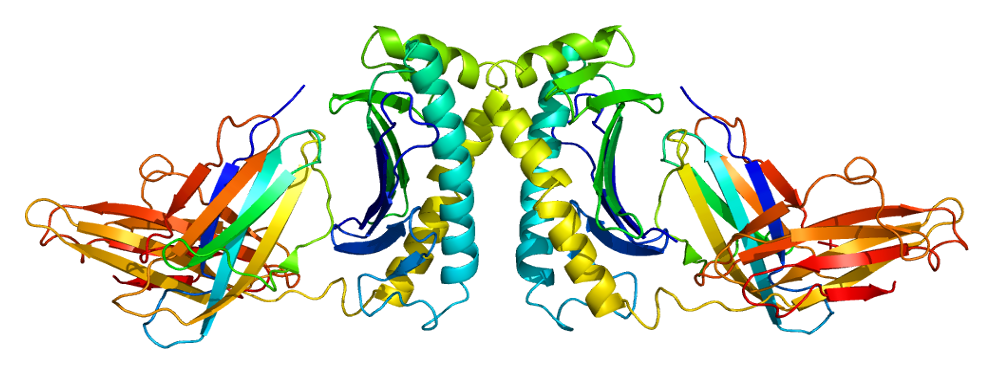

Identifiers
- Aliases: HFE, HFE1, HH, HLA-H, MVCD7, TFQTL2, HFE gene, hemochromatosis, homeostatic iron regulator
- External IDs: OMIM: 613609; MGI: 109191; GeneCards: HFE
Available structures
PDB	Ortholog search: PDBe RCSB
PDB	List of PDB id codes 1DE4, 1A6Z

Gene location (Human)
Chr.	Chromosome 6 (human)
Band	6p22.2	Start	26,087,281 bp
Band	6p22.2	End	26,098,343 bp

Gene location (Mouse)
Chr.	Chromosome 13 (mouse)
Band	13 A3.1|13 9.88 cM	Start	23,886,017 bp
Band	13 A3.1|13 9.88 cM	End	23,894,837 bp
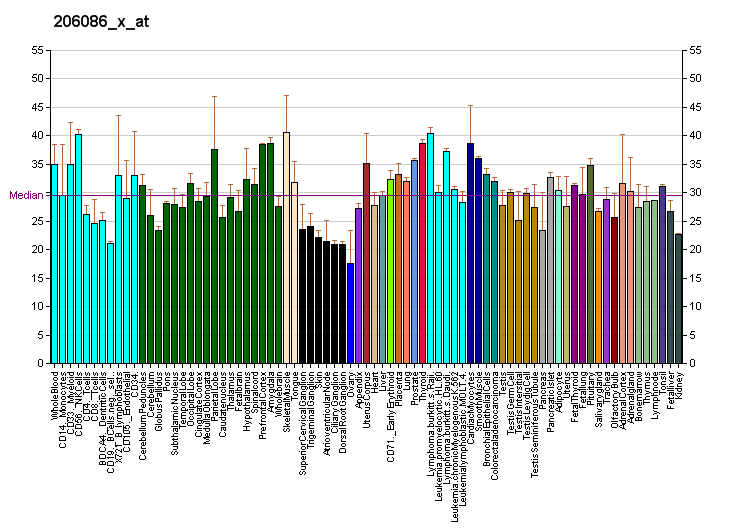

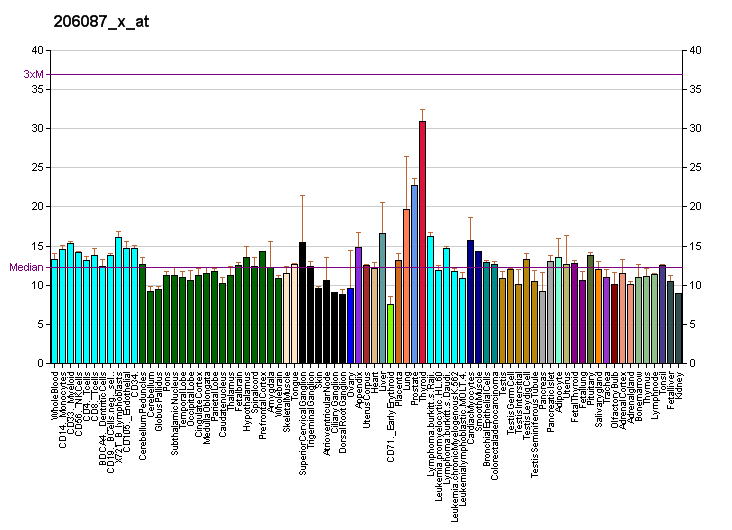

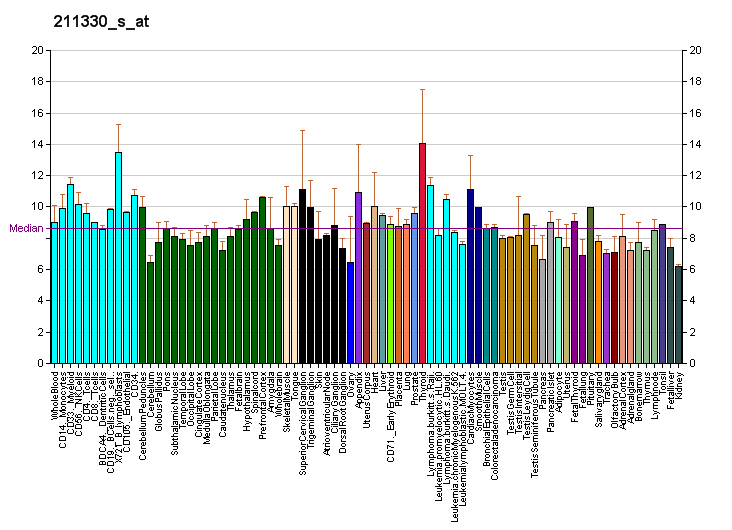
RNA expression pattern
Bgee	Human / Mouse (ortholog); Top expressed in: stromal cell of endometrium; Epithelium of choroid plexus; monocyte; right adrenal cortex; smooth muscle tissue; cervix epithelium; seminal vesicula; left adrenal gland; Achilles tendon; gallbladder / Top expressed in: Epithelium of choroid plexus; stroma of bone marrow; epithelium of lens; left lobe of liver; choroid plexus of fourth ventricle; white adipose tissue; right ventricle; carotid body; myocardium of ventricle; triceps brachii muscle; More reference expression data
BioGPS	More reference expression data
Gene ontology
Molecular function	peptide antigen binding; beta-2-microglobulin binding; co-receptor binding; protein binding; transferrin receptor binding; signaling receptor binding; natural killer cell lectin-like receptor binding
Cellular component	integral component of membrane; recycling endosome; HFE-transferrin receptor complex; membrane; basal part of cell; plasma membrane; apical part of cell; integral component of plasma membrane; terminal web; early endosome; MHC class I protein complex; perinuclear region of cytoplasm; cytoplasmic vesicle; external side of plasma membrane; extracellular space
Biological process	negative regulation of T cell antigen processing and presentation; positive regulation of peptide hormone secretion; positive regulation of receptor-mediated endocytosis; cellular response to iron ion; antigen processing and presentation; negative regulation of receptor binding; regulation of protein localization to cell surface; antigen processing and presentation of peptide antigen via MHC class I; female pregnancy; positive regulation of pathway-restricted SMAD protein phosphorylation; response to iron ion starvation; iron ion homeostasis; negative regulation of antigen processing and presentation of endogenous peptide antigen via MHC class I; ion transport; BMP signaling pathway; cellular response to iron ion starvation; response to iron ion; multicellular organismal iron ion homeostasis; positive regulation of ferrous iron binding; positive regulation of transferrin receptor binding; positive regulation of signaling receptor activity; liver regeneration; positive regulation of gene expression; negative regulation of T cell cytokine production; acute-phase response; negative regulation of proteasomal ubiquitin-dependent protein catabolic process; negative regulation of ubiquitin-dependent protein catabolic process; positive regulation of receptor binding; negative regulation of signaling receptor activity; positive regulation of protein binding; hormone biosynthetic process; negative regulation of CD8-positive, alpha-beta T cell activation; cellular iron ion homeostasis; iron ion import across plasma membrane; transferrin transport; protein-containing complex assembly; T cell mediated cytotoxicity; immune response; natural killer cell activation; natural killer cell mediated cytotoxicity; susceptibility to natural killer cell mediated cytotoxicity; regulation of iron ion transport
Sources:Amigo / QuickGO
Orthologs
Databases	NCBI: entry; OMA: entry
Species	Human	Mouse
Entrez	3077	15216
Ensembl	ENSG00000010704	ENSMUSG00000006611
UniProt	Q30201	P70387
RefSeq (mRNA)	NM_000410; NM_001300749; NM_139002; NM_139003; NM_139004 NM_139005; NM_139006; NM_139007; NM_139008; NM_139009; NM_139010; NM_139011; NM_001384164	NM_010424; NM_001347493
RefSeq (protein)	NP_000401; NP_001287678; NP_620572; NP_620573; NP_620575 NP_620576; NP_620577; NP_620578; NP_620579; NP_620580; NP_001371093	NP_001334422; NP_034554
Location (UCSC)	Chr 6: 26.09 – 26.1 Mb	Chr 13: 23.89 – 23.89 Mb
PubMed search
- Wikidata
View/Edit Human	View/Edit Mouse

Human homeostatic iron regulator protein, also known as the HFE protein (High FE2+), is a transmembrane protein that in humans is encoded by the HFE gene. The HFE gene is located on short arm of chromosome 6 at location 6p22.2

== Function ==
The protein encoded by this gene is an integral membrane protein that is similar to MHC class I-type proteins and associates with beta-2 microglobulin (beta2M). It is thought that this protein functions to regulate circulating iron uptake by regulating the interaction of the transferrin receptor with transferrin.

The HFE gene contains seven exons spanning 12 kb. The full-length transcript represents six exons.

HFE protein is composed of 343 amino acids. There are several components, in sequence: a signal peptide (initial part of the protein), an extracellular transferrin receptor-binding region (α1 and α2), a portion that resembles immunoglobulin molecules (α3), a transmembrane region that anchors the protein in the cell membrane, and a short cytoplasmic tail.

HFE expression is subject to alternative splicing. The predominant HFE full-length transcript has ~4.2 kb. Alternative HFE splicing variants may serve as iron regulatory mechanisms in specific cells or tissues.

HFE is prominent in small intestinal absorptive cells, gastric epithelial cells, tissue macrophages, and blood monocytes and granulocytes, and the syncytiotrophoblast, an iron transport tissue in the placenta.

== Clinical significance ==
The iron storage disorder hereditary hemochromatosis (HHC) is an autosomal recessive genetic disorder that usually results from defects in this gene.

The disease-causing genetic variant most commonly associated with hemochromatosis is p. C282Y. About 1/200 of people of Northern European origin have two copies of this variant; they, particularly males, are at high risk of developing hemochromatosis. This variant may also be one of the factors modifying Wilson's disease phenotype, making the symptoms of the disease appear earlier.

Allele frequencies of HFE C282Y in ethnically diverse western European white populations are 5-14% and in North American non-Hispanic whites are 6-7%. C282Y exists as a polymorphism only in Western European white and derivative populations, although C282Y may have arisen independently in non-whites outside Europe.

HFE H63D is cosmopolitan but occurs with greatest frequency in individuals of European descent. Allele frequencies of H63D in ethnically diverse western European populations are 10-29%. and in North American non-Hispanic whites are 14-15%.

At least 42 mutations involving HFE introns and exons have been discovered, most of them in persons with hemochromatosis or their family members. Most of these mutations are rare. Many of the mutations cause or probably cause hemochromatosis phenotypes, often in compound heterozygosity with HFE C282Y. Other mutations are either synonymous or their effect on iron phenotypes, if any, has not been demonstrated.

== Interactions ==
The HFE protein interacts with the transferrin receptor TFRC. Its primary mode of action is the regulation of the iron storage hormone hepcidin.

== Hfe knockout mice ==
It is possible to delete part or all of a gene of interest in mice (or other experimental animals), as a means of studying the function of the gene and its protein. Such mice are called "knockouts" with respect to the deleted gene. Hfe is the mouse equivalent of the human hemochromatosis gene HFE. The protein encoded by HFE is Hfe. Mice homozygous (two abnormal gene copies) for a targeted knockout of all six transcribed Hfe exons are designated Hfe−/−. Iron-related traits of Hfe−/− mice, including increased iron absorption and hepatic iron loading, are inherited in an autosomal recessive pattern. Thus, the Hfe−/− mouse model simulates important genetic and physiological abnormalities of HFE hemochromatosis. Other knockout mice were created to delete the second and third HFE exons (corresponding to α1 and α2 domains of Hfe). Mice homozygous for this deletion also had increased duodenal iron absorption, elevated plasma iron and transferrin saturation levels, and iron overload, mainly in hepatocytes. Mice have also been created that are homozygous for a missense mutation in Hfe (C282Y). These mice correspond to humans with hemochromatosis who are homozygous for HFE C282Y. These mice develop iron loading that is less severe than that of Hfe−/− mice.

== HFE mutations and iron overload in other animals ==
The black rhinoceros (Diceros bicornis) can develop iron overload. To determine whether the HFE gene of black rhinoceroses has undergone mutation as an adaptive mechanism to improve iron absorption from iron-poor diets, Beutler et al. sequenced the entire HFE coding region of four species of rhinoceros (two browsing and two grazing species). Although HFE was well conserved across the species, numerous nucleotide differences were found between rhinoceros and human or mouse, some of which changed deduced amino acids. Only one allele, p.S88T in the black rhinoceros, was a candidate that might adversely affect HFE function. p.S88T occurs in a highly conserved region involved in the interaction of HFE and TfR1.

== See also ==
- HFE H63D gene mutation
- Hereditary haemochromatosis
