= HFE H63D gene mutation =

Human disease-causing mutation

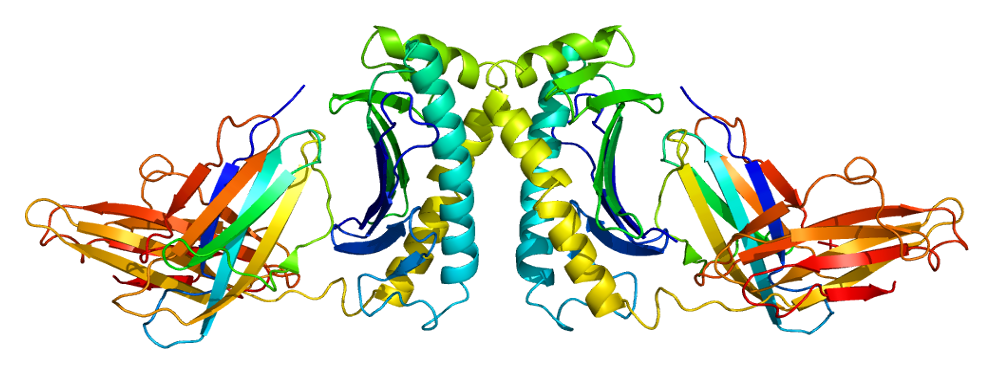
HFE

The HFE H63D is a single-nucleotide polymorphism in the HFE gene (c.187C>G, rs1799945), which results in the substitution of a histidine for an aspartic acid at amino acid position 63 of the HFE protein (p.His63Asp). HFE participates in the regulation of iron absorption.

Homozygous H63D variant can occasionally be the cause of hemochromatosis. It is also associated with the occurrence of other conditions like hypotransferrinemia, liver dysfunction, bone and joint issues, diabetes mellitus, heart disease, hormone imbalances, porphyria cutanea tarda (PCT), infertility, stroke, neurodegenerative and brain damages, some cancers, venous and peripheral artery disease.

== General health impacts ==
The primary risk associated with the H63D mutation is brain damage, as iron accumulation can cause oxidation within affected cells, ultimately leading to cell death and scarring of the brain tissue. Another potential consequence is abnormal levels of tau proteins and alpha-synuclein, which play a role in conditions like Alzheimer's, Lewy body dementia, and Parkinson's; patients homozygous for the H63D mutation show a higher risk of earlier signs of cognitive impairment and earlier onset of dementias compared to individuals with normal or heterozygous genotypes. A study in 2020 predicted that the H63D variant may be a risk factor for incidental amyotrophic lateral sclerosis in a Han Chinese population. Some individuals with the homozygous H63D variant may show signs of heart disease, cardiomyopathies, and disturbances in the calcium channels in particular. The homozygous H63D variant is an indicator of the iron metabolism disorder hemochromatosis, which may increase the risk of developing a fatty liver. In patients with a cirrhotic liver, the mutation can increase the rate of liver cancer.

== H63D syndrome ==
At present, "H63D syndrome" is not medically recognized. It remains a speculative concept without backing from robust clinical trials or consensus.

H63D syndrome is a very rare clinical phenotype based on a homozygous mutation of the HFE gene. This mutation is associated with diverse health issues, however H63D syndrome is the only known specific expression of a homozygous HFE-H63D mutation to date. The homozygous HFE-H63D mutation is the cause of classic and treatable hemochromatosis in only 6.7% of its carriers. H63D syndrome is independently a distinct entity, and the incidence in homozygous carriers of the H63D mutation is approximately 10%.

=== Pathomechanism ===
Typically, laboratory tests show an excessive and static transferrin saturation based on a relative deficiency of transferrin. The transferrin value is pre- and postprandial static low. Thus, the body does not respond to nutritive iron supplementation by providing more transferrin. This allows free iron of non-transferrin bound type (NTBI, labile iron pool) can enter various parenchymal tissues and trigger degenerative changes there by oxidation cascades. Iron overload primarily affects nerve cells in the substantia nigra and basal ganglia. Here, a slowly progressive degeneration occurs. In addition, many H63D syndrome patients experience nonspecific activation of the innate immune system, which can additionally lead to spontaneously occurring, passive autoimmune reactions of variable type and severity.

=== H63D syndrome symptoms ===
- Variable motor dysfunction, possibly including Parkinson's symptoms late in the course.
- Postural instability analogous to Parkinson's disease.
- Narcolepsy, often with cataplexy - when manifestation of degenerative and irreversible brain damage has already occurred.
- Cognitive dysfunction: Often highly severe and usually primarily obsessive in nature, compatible with dysfunction of the basal ganglia. They are often misrecognized - especially in the early phase of the disease - in the sense of a misdiagnosis as "mental suffering". If thought disorders are in the foreground, a timely diagnosis is therefore often delayed.
- Tic disorders: variable Tourette's-like tics occurring with a strongly fluctuating course.
- Hyperkinesias, sometimes with self-injuries.
- Disturbance of REM sleep with risk of self-injury.
- Dementia of varying severity from mild cognitive impairment to full-blown dementia, most compatible with Lewy body dementia. Clinically relevant changes occur in 30% to 60% of H63D patients, depending on the study. Variability is due to nonstandardized measurement procedures and cut-off values, especially in mild cognitive impairment. Higher risk of dementia for homozygous H63D genotype men has been observed, but this association has not been observed in women.
- Cognitive impairments: This aspect is often masked by performance reserves over time (months to years), especially in previously cognitively strong patients, but can lead to significant failures in daily and occupational functioning under high sensory and complex content input.
- Decline in intelligence quotients despite preserved selective performance in areas that can be relatively well delineated diagnostically.
- Impairment of executive functions with preserved long-term memory. The occurrence or worsening of narcolepsy with a decrease in tic symptomatology is indicative of progressive damage to brain tissue, mainly in the region of the substantia nigra.
- Cardiac damage and dysfunction, especially conduction defects and arrhythmias, occasionally progressing to heart failure.
- Liver damage (even early in the course, often an unexplained steatosis).
- Excessive episodes of the innate part of the immune system with highly variable autoimmune reactions, including periods of decreased defense of the adaptive immune system.
- Fibrosis in various organ systems, including the skin.
- Impaired motility in the digestive system, usually constipation, less commonly bloating.
- Testicular atrophy, erectile dysfunction and degeneration of penile tissue degeneration (shrinking of the shaft) in male patients, sometimes with unspecific degenerative signs on sonography like calcifications.
- Skin symptoms of variable nature (including impetigo, pruritus, hyper-responsiveness, hidradenitis suppurativa, etc.).
- Rarely: kidney involvement, eye diseases due to NTBI-induced oxidative processes, hearing loss, etc.
- Rather later in the course, with already structurally altered substantia nigra: urge incontinence in all its manifestations.
- Chronic eosinophilia with possible structural damage to the heart.
- Disorders of adrenal and other endocrine organ function due to oxidative-related inflammatory processes with functional or structural organ damage caused by infiltration processes in the adrenal cortex region. (primary adrenal insufficiency). Subsequently, there is clinically relevant dysfunction of the HPA axis as well as adrenaline synthesis in the adrenal medulla with erratic adrenaline excesses. Due to the variety of symptoms, the syndrome is usually diagnosed relatively late, especially if all relevant parameters of iron metabolisms are not obtained by laboratory diagnosis.

=== Laboratory ===
The typical constellation of findings is indicative: The patients show a postprandial non-responsive and too low and static transferrin level (hypotransferrinemia) with high transferrin saturation (usually > 55 %) and low ferritin value. Multiple tests are obligatory due to physiologically induced fluctuations. Mild persistent eosinophilia and basophilia are sometimes found in parallel.

=== Imaging ===
On transcranial sonography, the substantia nigra presents as in Parkinson's disease hyperechogenic, but the symptoms need not be identical. With rare exceptions, MRI remains unremarkable. The scintigraphy (DAT scan) may also be abnormal. Due to radiation exposure and advances in the field of sonography, DAT scans are now mostly used only in the context of clinical trials for this condition.

=== Pathohistology ===
There is deposition of free iron in the brain and other tissues. NTBI iron cannot be stained in histology (e.g., with the (Berlin Blue staining). This is a common source of error or reason for false-negatives.

=== Therapies ===
No causal treatment for H63D syndrome is currently (2023) available. Free iron not bound to proteins cannot be removed from the body by phlebotomy and related procedures. Instead, the patient would merely suffer a further drop in his already usually low ferritin level. Consequently, dialysis and iron chelators are also ineffective and are more likely to provoke lethal side effects than to improve the clinical picture. Various drugs can be used to alleviate some symptoms - some in off-label use. In addition, medical assistive devices such as orthotics, hard hats, walkers, or wheelchairs are useful.

== Impact on athletic performance in healthy individuals ==
A 2020 study revealed that the homozygous H63D variant (as well as the heterozygous one) is significantly higher in elite endurance athletes comparing to ethnically-matched controls in Russian and Japanese populations, and is associated with high V̇O_{2max} in male athletes.

== External sources ==
- "H63D - The Other Mutation" (PDF). Iron Disorders Institute nanograms. 2010.
- Nandar W, Connor JR (2011). "HFE Gene Variants Affect Iron in the Brain". The Journal of Nutrition. 141 (4): 729S–739S. doi:10.3945/jn.110.130351. PMID 21346098.
- Adams P, Brissot P, Powell LW (2000). "EASL International Consensus Conference on Haemochromatosis". Journal of Hepatology. 33 (3): 496–504. doi:10.1016/S0168-8278(01)80875-8. PMID 11020008.
- Bridle K, Cheung TK, Murphy T, et al. (2006). "Hepcidin is down-regulated in alcoholic liver injury: implications for the pathogenesis of alcoholic liver disease". Alcoholism: Clinical and Experimental Research. 30 (1): 106–12. doi:10.1111/j.1530-0277.2006.00002.x. PMID 16433737.
- Nandar and Connor HFE Gene Variants Affect Iron in the Brain The Journal of Nutrition 2011.
- Adams et al EASL International Consensus Conference on Haemochromatosis Journal of Hepatology 2000
- Liu et al Mutant HFE H63D Protein Is Associated with Prolonged Endoplasmic Reticulum Stress and Increased Neuronal Vulnerability J Biol Chem. 2011
- Diamandis et al Preprint: H63D Syndrome: Quick Reference Guide Authorea, 2021
- Papadopoulos et al Prevalence of Narcolepsy in Patients with H63D Syndrome Sys Rev Pharm 2021
- International H63D Syndrome Research Consortium, LCG Greece Research, Jewish University of Colorado, Dr. Marianne Kaufmann Association for H63D Patients, Luzia Healthcare n.e.V, Adams, Jacob, & Diamandis, Carolina. (2022). H63D Syndrome renamed Oslo Syndrome (6.2). Zenodo.
