= Transferrin receptor 2 =

Mammalian protein found in Homo sapiens

TFR2

Identifiers
- Aliases: TFR2, HFE3, TFRC2, transferrin receptor 2
- External IDs: OMIM: 604720; MGI: 1354956; GeneCards: TFR2

Gene location (Human)
Chr.	Chromosome 7 (human)
Band	7q22.1	Start	100,620,416 bp
Band	7q22.1	End	100,642,779 bp

Gene location (Mouse)
Chr.	Chromosome 5 (mouse)
Band	5|5 G2	Start	137,568,102 bp
Band	5|5 G2	End	137,585,743 bp
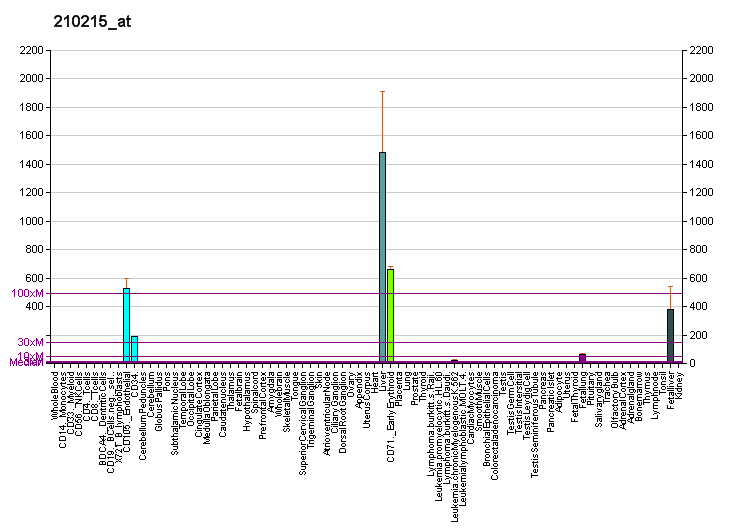

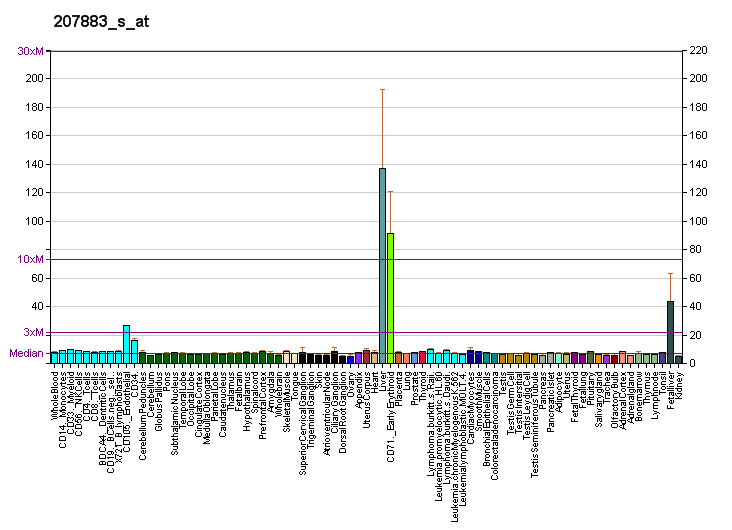
RNA expression pattern
Bgee	Human / Mouse (ortholog); Top expressed in: right lobe of liver; vena cava; buccal mucosa cell; trabecular bone; nipple; pylorus; pericardium; superior surface of tongue; male germ cell; sperm / Top expressed in: left lobe of liver; fetal liver hematopoietic progenitor cell; sexually immature organism; motor neuron; barrel cortex; substantia nigra; tibiofemoral joint; bone marrow; embryo; suprachiasmatic nucleus; More reference expression data
BioGPS	More reference expression data
Gene ontology
Molecular function	transferrin receptor activity; co-receptor binding; protein binding
Cellular component	cytoplasm; integral component of membrane; integral component of plasma membrane; membrane; cytoplasmic vesicle; HFE-transferrin receptor complex; external side of plasma membrane; plasma membrane
Biological process	positive regulation of endocytosis; receptor-mediated endocytosis; iron ion transport; positive regulation of peptide hormone secretion; cellular response to iron ion; response to iron ion; positive regulation of transcription by RNA polymerase II; cellular iron ion homeostasis; positive regulation of protein maturation; iron ion homeostasis; acute-phase response; transferrin transport; endocytic iron import into cell
Sources:Amigo / QuickGO
Orthologs
Databases	NCBI: entry; OMA: entry
Species	Human	Mouse
Entrez	7036	50765
Ensembl	ENSG00000106327	ENSMUSG00000029716
UniProt	Q9UP52	Q9JKX3
RefSeq (mRNA)	NM_001206855; NM_003227	NM_001289507; NM_001289509; NM_001289511; NM_015799; NM_001359206
RefSeq (protein)	NP_001193784; NP_003218	NP_001276436; NP_001276438; NP_001276440; NP_056614; NP_001346135
Location (UCSC)	Chr 7: 100.62 – 100.64 Mb	Chr 5: 137.57 – 137.59 Mb
PubMed search
- Wikidata
View/Edit Human	View/Edit Mouse

Transferrin receptor 2 (TfR2) is a protein that in humans is encoded by the TFR2 gene. This protein is involved in the uptake of transferrin-bound iron into cells by endocytosis, although its role is minor compared to transferrin receptor 1.

== Function ==
This gene is a member of the transferrin receptor-like family and encodes a single-pass type II membrane protein with a protease associated (PA) domain, an M28 peptidase domain and a transferrin receptor-like dimerization domain. This protein mediates cellular uptake of transferrin-bound iron and mutations in this gene have been associated with hereditary hemochromatosis type III. Alternatively spliced variants which encode different protein isoforms have been described; however, not all variants have been fully characterized.

== See also ==
- Transferrin receptor 1
- Transferrin
