= Ghretropin =

A ghretropin is a substance, usually a peptide, that increases the secretion of the "hunger hormone" ghrelin when consumed. Ghretropins that work on mice have been reported in the enzymatic digests of wheat, rice, and soy bean proteins. When a mouse consumes a purified version of the peptide, its plasma concentration of ghrelin and food intake increase. If they also work on humans, they may represent a way to boost the appetite of elderly and anorexic people.

== List of ghretropins ==
Name	Sequence	Year discovered	Effective in
Soy-ghretropin	NKNPFLFGSNR	2016	Mice (MGN3-1 cell culture, oral)
Wheat ghretropin A	SQQQQPVLPQQPSF	2021	Mice (MGN3-1 cell culture, oral)
Wheat ghretropin B	LSVTSPQQVSY	2021	Mice (MGN3-1 cell culture)
Wheat ghretropin C	YPTSL	2021	Mice (MGN3-1 cell culture)
Rice ghretropin A	QAFEPIRSV	2022	Mice (MGN3-1 cell culture, oral)
Rice ghretropin B	TNPWHSPRQGSF	2022	Mice (MGN3-1 cell culture, oral)
