= Serum total protein =

Parameter representing the concentration of protein

- Purpose: test for measuring the total amount of protein in serum

Serum total protein, also known as total protein, is a clinical chemistry parameter representing the concentration of protein in serum. Serum contains many proteins including serum albumin, a variety of globulins, and many others. While it is possible to analyze these proteins individually, total protein is a relatively quick and inexpensive analysis that does not discriminate by protein type.

The traditional method for measuring total protein uses the biuret reagent, but other chemical methods such as dye-binding and refractometry are now available. The measurement is usually performed on automated analysers along with other laboratory tests.

== Interpretation ==
The reference range for total protein is typically 60-80g/L. (It is also sometimes reported as "6.0-8.0g/dl"), but this may vary depending on the method of analysis.

- Concentrations below the reference range usually reflect low albumin concentration, for instance in liver disease or acute infection. Rarely, low total protein may be a sign of immunodeficiency.
- Concentrations above the reference range are found in paraproteinaemia, Hodgkin's lymphoma, leukaemia or any condition causing an increase in immunoglobulins. Total protein is also commonly elevated in dehydration and C677T gene mutation.

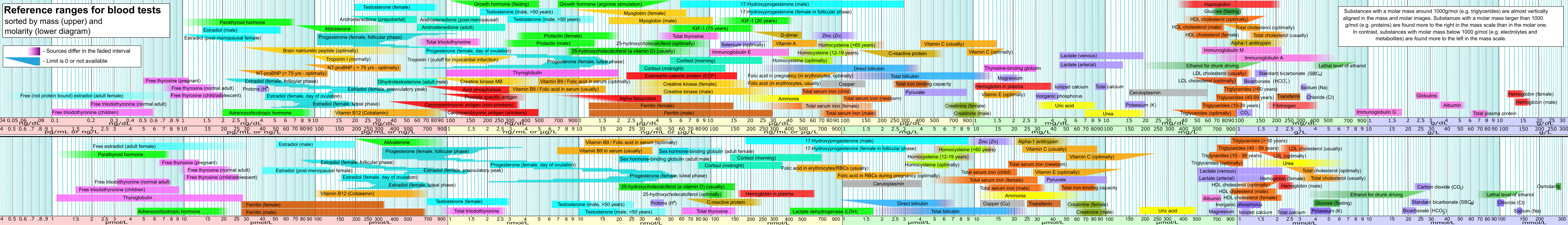
Reference ranges for blood tests, with total plasma protein (shown in purple at right) with other constituents.
