= Transferrin receptor =

Family of transport proteins

Transferrin receptor 1
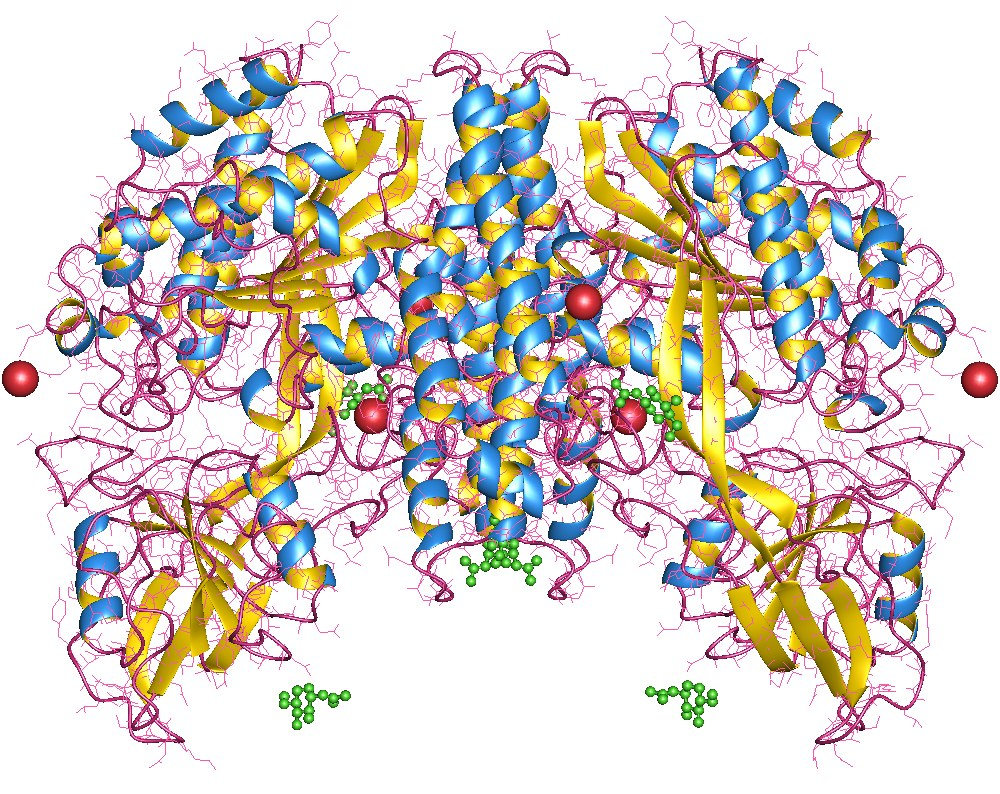
- Transferrin receptor 1, dimer, Human

Identifiers
- Symbol: TFRC
- Alt. symbols: CD71, TFR1
- NCBI gene: 7037
- HGNC: 11763
- OMIM: 190010
- RefSeq: NM_003234
- UniProt: P02786

Other data
- Locus: Chr. 3 q29
Search for
- Structures: Swiss-model
- Domains: InterPro

Transferrin receptor 2

Identifiers
- Symbol: TFR2
- Alt. symbols: HFE3, TFRC2
- NCBI gene: 7036
- HGNC: 11762
- OMIM: 604720
- RefSeq: NM_003227
- UniProt: Q9UP52

Other data
- Locus: Chr. 7 q22
Search for
- Structures: Swiss-model
- Domains: InterPro

Transferrin receptor (TfR) is a carrier protein for transferrin. It is needed for the import of iron into cells and is regulated in response to intracellular iron concentration. It imports iron by internalizing the transferrin-iron complex through receptor-mediated endocytosis. The existence of a receptor for transferrin iron uptake has been recognized since the late 1950s. Earlier two transferrin receptors in humans, transferrin receptor 1 and transferrin receptor 2 had been characterized and until recently cellular iron uptake was believed to occur chiefly via these two well documented transferrin receptors. Both these receptors are transmembrane glycoproteins. TfR1 is a high affinity ubiquitously expressed receptor while expression of TfR2 is restricted to certain cell types and is unaffected by intracellular iron concentrations. TfR2 binds to transferrin with a 25-30 fold lower affinity than TfR1. Although TfR1 mediated iron uptake is the major pathway for iron acquisition by most cells and especially developing erythrocytes, several studies have indicated that the uptake mechanism varies depending upon the cell type. It is also reported that Tf uptake exists independent of these TfRs although the mechanisms are not well characterized. The multifunctional glycolytic enzyme glyceraldehyde 3-phosphate dehydrogenase (GAPDH, EC 1.2.1.12) has been shown to utilize post translational modifications to exhibit higher order moonlighting behavior wherein it switches its function as a holo or apo transferrin receptor leading to either iron delivery or iron export respectively.

== Post-transcriptional regulation ==
Low iron concentrations promote increased levels of transferrin receptor, to increase iron intake into the cell. Thus, transferrin receptor maintains cellular iron homeostasis.

TfR production in the cell is regulated according to iron levels by iron-responsive element-binding proteins, IRP1 and IRP2. In the absence of iron, one of these proteins (generally IRP2) binds to the hairpin like structure (IRE) that is in the 3' UTR of the TfR mRNA. Once binding occurs, the mRNA is stabilized and degradation is inhibited.

== See also ==
- Transferrin receptor 1
- Transferrin receptor 2
- Soluble transferrin receptor
- GAPDH
