= Transferrin receptor 1 =

Protein-coding gene in the species Homo sapiens

TFRC
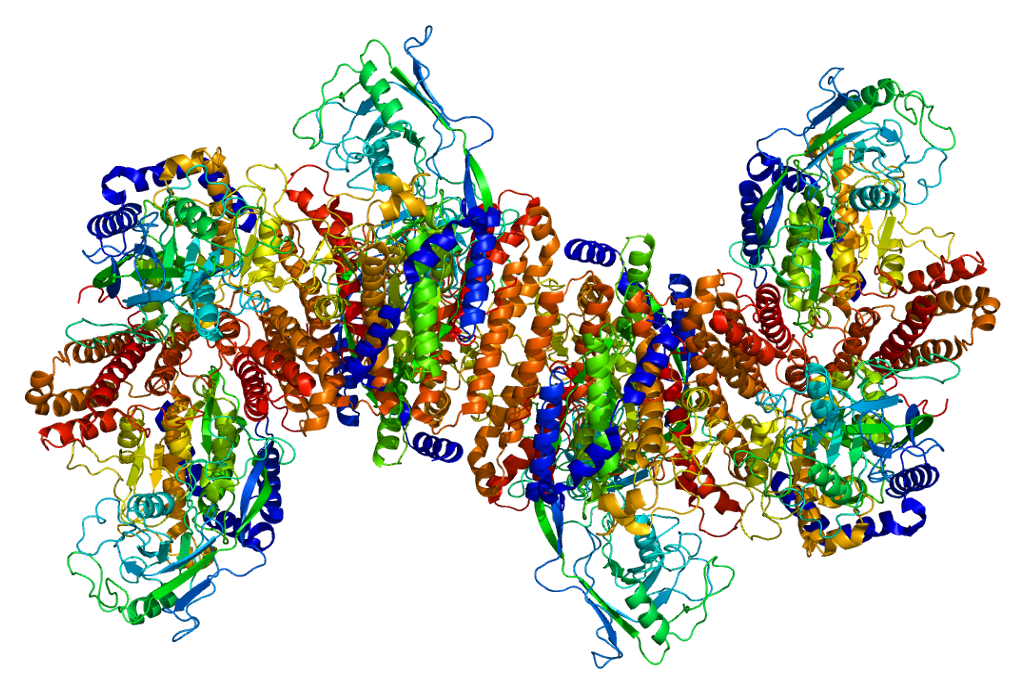

Identifiers
- Aliases: TFRC, CD71, T9, TFR, TFR1, TR, TRFR, p90, IMD46, transferrin receptor
- External IDs: OMIM: 190010; MGI: 98822; GeneCards: TFRC
Available structures
PDB	Ortholog search: PDBe RCSB
PDB	List of PDB id codes 1CX8, 1DE4, 1SUV, 2NSU, 3KAS, 3S9L, 3S9M, 3S9N

Gene location (Human)
Chr.	Chromosome 3 (human)
Band	3q29	Start	196,027,183 bp
Band	3q29	End	196,082,096 bp

Gene location (Mouse)
Chr.	Chromosome 16 (mouse)
Band	16 B3|16 23.06 cM	Start	32,427,738 bp
Band	16 B3|16 23.06 cM	End	32,451,612 bp
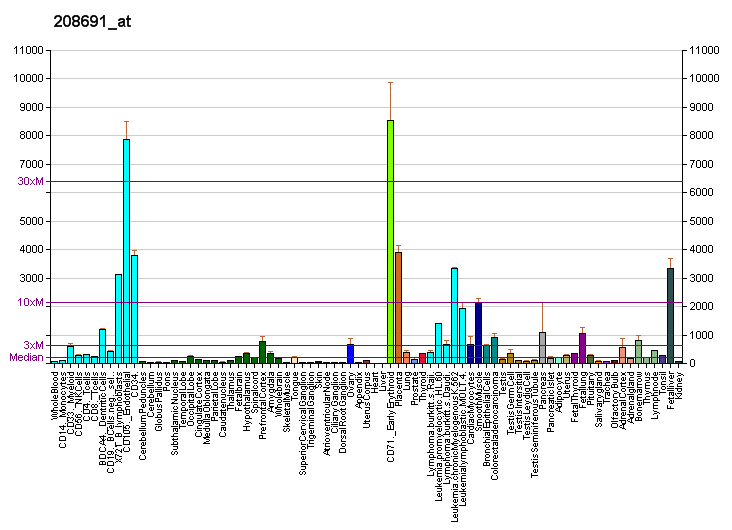

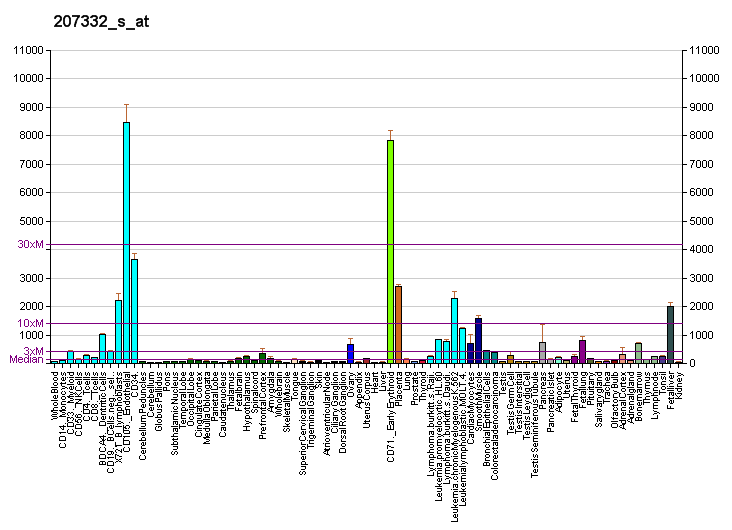
RNA expression pattern
Bgee	Human / Mouse (ortholog); Top expressed in: endothelial cell; trabecular bone; tibia; germinal epithelium; visceral pleura; hair follicle; parietal pleura; periodontal fiber; mucosa of sigmoid colon; bone marrow / Top expressed in: fetal liver hematopoietic progenitor cell; body of femur; habenula; stroma of bone marrow; tibiofemoral joint; temporal muscle; human fetus; vastus lateralis muscle; digastric muscle; ankle; More reference expression data
BioGPS	More reference expression data
Gene ontology
Molecular function	protein homodimerization activity; virus receptor activity; transferrin receptor activity; identical protein binding; double-stranded RNA binding; RNA binding; protein binding
Cellular component	extracellular vesicle; integral component of membrane; recycling endosome; HFE-transferrin receptor complex; endosome; blood microparticle; membrane; melanosome; plasma membrane; integral component of plasma membrane; extracellular region; cell surface; basolateral plasma membrane; perinuclear region of cytoplasm; clathrin-coated pit; extracellular exosome; external side of plasma membrane; extracellular space; clathrin-coated vesicle membrane; cytoplasmic vesicle; endosome membrane; early endosome
Biological process	endocytosis; osteoclast differentiation; positive regulation of bone resorption; receptor-mediated endocytosis; regulation of cell population proliferation; regulation of cell growth; viral entry into host cell; viral process; cellular iron ion homeostasis; positive regulation of isotype switching; receptor internalization; transferrin transport; positive regulation of B cell proliferation; positive regulation of T cell proliferation; membrane organization; cellular response to leukemia inhibitory factor; iron ion transport
Sources:Amigo / QuickGO
Orthologs
Databases	NCBI: entry; OMA: entry
Species	Human	Mouse
Entrez	7037	22042
Ensembl	ENSG00000072274	ENSMUSG00000022797
UniProt	P02786	Q62351
RefSeq (mRNA)	NM_001313965; NM_001313966; NM_001128148; NM_003234	NM_011638; NM_001357298
RefSeq (protein)	NP_001121620; NP_001300894; NP_001300895; NP_003225	NP_035768; NP_001344227
Location (UCSC)	Chr 3: 196.03 – 196.08 Mb	Chr 16: 32.43 – 32.45 Mb
PubMed search
- Wikidata
View/Edit Human	View/Edit Mouse

Transferrin receptor protein 1 (TfR1), also known as Cluster of Differentiation 71 (CD71), is a protein that in humans is encoded by the TFRC gene. TfR1 is required for iron import from transferrin into cells by endocytosis.

== Structure and function ==
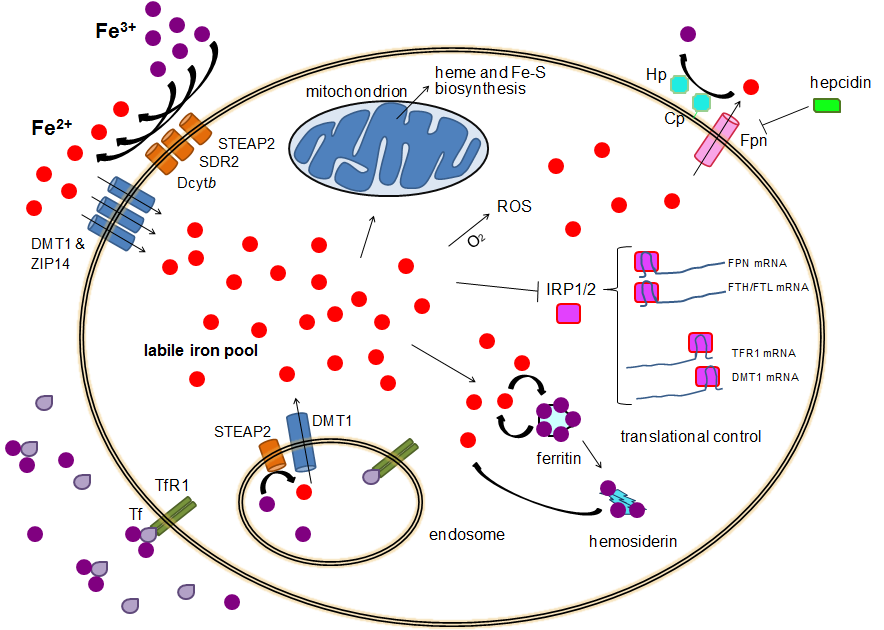
TfR1 = transferrin receptor 1 in Human iron metabolism.

TfR1 is a transmembrane glycoprotein composed of two disulfide-linked monomers joined by two disulfide bonds. Each monomer binds one holo-transferrin molecule creating an iron-Tf-TfR complex which enters the cell by endocytosis.

== Clinical significance ==
TfR1 as a potential new target in cases of human leukemia & lymphoma. InatherYs, in Évry, France, developed a candidate drug, INA01 antibody (anti-CD71) that showed efficacy in pre-clinical studies in the therapy of two incurable orphan oncohematological diseases: the adult T cell leukemia (ATLL) caused by HTLV-1 and the Mantle cell lymphoma (MCL).

TfR1 expressed on the endothelial cells of the blood-brain barrier (BBB) is used also in preclinical research to allow the delivery of large molecules including antibodies into the brain. Some of the TfR1 targeting antibodies have been shown to cross the blood-brain barrier, without interfering with the uptake of iron. Amongst those are the mouse anti rat-TfR antibody OX26 and the rat anti mouse-TfR antibody 8D3. The affinity of the antibody-TfR interaction seems to be important determining the success of transcytotic transport over endothelial cells of the BBB. Monovalent TfR interaction favors BBB transport due to altered intracellular sorting pathways. Avidity effects of bivalent interactions redirecting transport to the lysosome. Also, reducing TfR binding affinity directly promote dissociation from the TfR which increase brain parenchymal exposure of the TfR binding antibody.

== Interactions ==
TfR1 has been shown to interact with GABARAP and HFE.

== Immunostain marker ==
CD71 is a robust immunohistochemistry marker for chorionic villi, especially in necrotic specimens. Among white blood cells and precursors, CD71 is expressed only by erythroid precursors within the normal hematopoietic marrow and spleen, in contrast to glycophorin that marks all types of red blood cells.

== See also ==
- Transferrin receptor 2
- Cluster of differentiation
