= Serum (blood) =

Fluid and solute component of blood

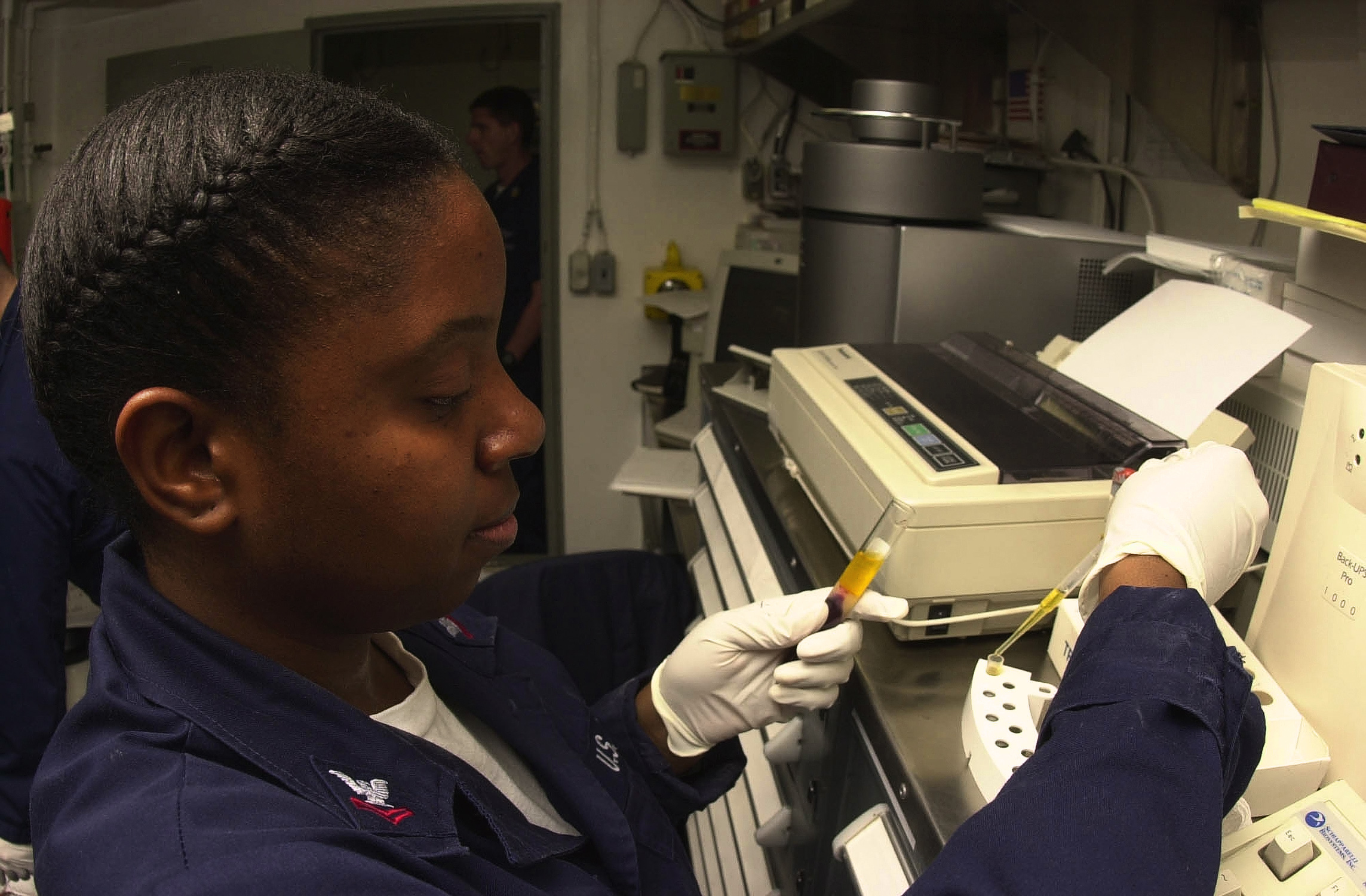
Preparation of serum cups for a lipids panel designed to test cholesterol levels in a patient's blood

Serum (/ˈsɪərəm/) is the fluid and solvent component of blood which does not play a role in clotting. It may be defined as blood plasma without the clotting factors, or as blood with all cells and clotting factors removed. Serum contains all proteins except clotting factors (involved in blood clotting), including all electrolytes, antibodies, antigens, hormones; and any exogenous substances (e.g., drugs, microorganisms). Serum also does not contain all the formed elements of blood, which include blood cells, white blood cells (leukocytes, lymphocytes), red blood cells (erythrocytes), and platelets.

The study of serum is serology. Serum is used in numerous diagnostic tests as well as blood typing. Measuring the concentration of various molecules can be useful for many applications, such as determining the therapeutic index of a drug candidate in a clinical trial.

To obtain serum, a blood sample is allowed to clot (coagulation). The sample is then centrifuged to remove the clot and blood cells, and the resulting liquid supernatant is serum.

== Clinical and laboratory uses ==
The serum of convalescent patients successfully recovering (or already recovered) from an infectious disease can be used as a biopharmaceutical in the treatment of other people with that disease, because the antibodies generated by the successful recovery are potent fighters of the pathogen. Such convalescent serum (antiserum) is a form of immunotherapy.

Serum is also used in protein electrophoresis, due to the lack of fibrinogen which can cause false results.

Fetal bovine serum (FBS) is rich in growth factors and is frequently added to growth media used for eukaryotic cell culture. A combination of FBS and the cytokine leukemia inhibitory factor was originally used to maintain embryonic stem cells, but concerns about batch-to-batch variations in FBS have led to the development of serum substitutes.

Vertebrate sera (such as FBS) or invertebrate hemolymph were also used for the growth of insect cell lines as a source of nutrients and growth factors. Cost and other factors lead to the development of replacement media and cell lines that grow well in these media.

== Purification strategies ==
Blood serum and plasma are some of the largest sources of biomarkers, whether for diagnostics or therapeutics. Its vast dynamic range, further complicated by the presence of lipids, salts, and post-translational modifications, as well as multiple mechanisms of degradation, presents challenges in analytical reproducibility, sensitivity, resolution, and potential efficacy. For analysis of biomarkers in blood serum samples, it is possible to do a pre-separation by free-flow electrophoresis that usually consists of a depletion of serum albumin protein. This method enables greater penetration of the proteome via separation of a wide variety of charged or chargeable analytes, ranging from small molecules to cells.

== Usage note ==
Like many other mass nouns, the word serum can be pluralized when used in certain senses. To speak of multiple serum specimens from multiple people (each with a unique population of antibodies), physicians sometimes speak of sera (the Latin plural, as opposed to serums). Etymologically serum is derived from the Proto-Indo-European *ser- ("to flow, run").

== See also ==
- Antiserum
- Albumin
- Blood fractionation
- Globulin
- Human serum albumin
- Lipid
- Serum iron
- Serum protein electrophoresis
- Serum-separating tube
- Serum total protein
