= Reference ranges for blood tests =

Common human medical data ranges for blood test results

Reference ranges (reference intervals) for blood tests are sets of values used by a health professional to interpret a set of medical test results from blood samples. Reference ranges for blood tests are studied within the field of clinical chemistry (also known as "clinical biochemistry", "chemical pathology" or "pure blood chemistry"), the area of pathology that is generally concerned with analysis of bodily fluids.

Blood test results should always be interpreted using the reference range provided by the laboratory that performed the test.

== Interpretation ==
A reference range is usually defined as the set of values 95 percent of the normal population falls within (that is, 95% prediction interval). It is determined by collecting data from vast numbers of laboratory tests.

=== Plasma or whole blood ===
In this article, all values (except the ones listed below) denote blood plasma concentration, which is approximately 60–100% larger than the actual blood concentration if the amount inside red blood cells (RBCs) is negligible. The precise factor depends on hematocrit as well as amount inside RBCs. Exceptions are mainly those values that denote total blood concentration, and in this article they are:

- All values in Hematology – red blood cells (except hemoglobin in plasma)
- All values in Hematology – white blood cells
- Platelet count (Plt)

A few values are for inside red blood cells only:

- Vitamin B_{9} (folic acid/folate) in red blood cells
- Mean corpuscular hemoglobin concentration (MCHC)

=== Units ===
- Mass concentration (g/dL or g/L) is the most common measurement unit in the United States. Is usually given with dL (decilitres) as the denominator in the United States, and usually with L (litres) in, for example, Sweden.
- Molar concentration (mol/L) is used to a higher degree in most of the rest of the world, including the United Kingdom and other parts of Europe and Australia and New Zealand.
- International units (IU) are based on measured biological activity or effect, or for some substances, a specified equivalent mass.
- Enzyme activity (kat) is commonly used for e.g. liver function tests like AST, ALT, LD and γ-GT in Sweden.
- Percentages and time-dependent units (mol/s) are used for calculated derived parameters, e.g. for beta cell function in homeostasis model assessment or thyroid's secretory capacity.

=== Arterial or venous ===
If not otherwise specified, a reference range for a blood test is generally the venous range, as the standard process of obtaining a sample is by venipuncture. An exception is for acid–base and blood gases, which are generally given for arterial blood.

Still, the blood values are approximately equal between the arterial and venous sides for most substances, with the exception of acid–base, blood gases and drugs (used in therapeutic drug monitoring (TDM) assays). Arterial levels for drugs are generally higher than venous levels because of extraction while passing through tissues.

=== Usual or optimal ===
Reference ranges are usually given as what are the usual (or normal) values found in the population, more specifically the prediction interval that 95% of the population fall into. This may also be called standard range. In contrast, optimal (health) range or therapeutic target is a reference range or limit that is based on concentrations or levels that are associated with optimal health or minimal risk of related complications and diseases. For most substances presented, the optimal levels are the ones normally found in the population as well. More specifically, optimal levels are generally close to a central tendency of the values found in the population. However, usual and optimal levels may differ substantially, most notably among vitamins and blood lipids, so these tables give limits on both standard and optimal (or target) ranges. In addition, some values, including troponin I and brain natriuretic peptide, are given as the estimated appropriate cutoffs to distinguish healthy people from people with specific conditions, which here are myocardial infarction and congestive heart failure, respectively, for the aforementioned substances.

=== Variability ===
References range may vary with age, sex, race, pregnancy, diet, use of prescribed or herbal drugs and stress. Reference ranges often depend on the analytical method used, for reasons such as inaccuracy, lack of standardisation, lack of certified reference material and differing antibody reactivity. Also, reference ranges may be inaccurate when the reference groups used to establish the ranges are small.

== Sorted by concentration ==
=== By mass and molarity ===
Smaller, narrower boxes indicate a more tight homeostatic regulation when measured as standard "usual" reference range.

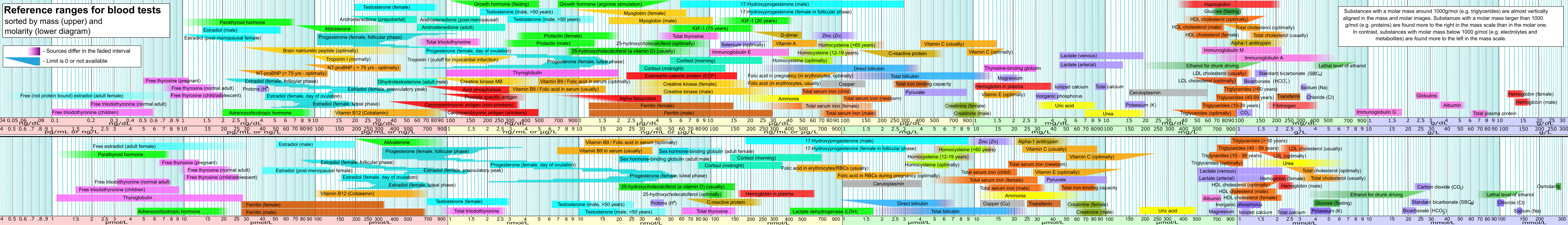
Reference ranges for blood tests, sorted logarithmically by mass above the scale and by molarity below. (A separate printable image is available for mass and molarity)

Hormones predominate at the left part of the scale, shown with a red at ng/L or pmol/L, being in very low concentration. There appears to be the greatest cluster of substances in the yellow part (μg/L or nmol/L), becoming sparser in the green part (mg/L or μmol/L). However, there is another cluster containing many metabolic substances like cholesterol and glucose at the limit with the blue part (g/L or mmol/L).

The unit conversions of substance concentrations from the molar to the mass concentration scale above are made as follows:

- Numerically:

$$\text{molar concentration} \times \text{molar mass} = \text{mass concentration}$$

- Measured directly in distance on the scales:

$$\log_{10} \frac{\text{molar mass}}{1000} = \text{distance to right (decades)}$$,

where distance is the direct (not logarithmic) distance in number of decades or "octaves" to the right the mass concentration is found. To translate from mass to molar concentration, the dividend (molar mass and the divisor (1000) in the division change places, or, alternatively, distance to right is changed to distance to left. Substances with a molar mass around 1000g/mol (e.g. thyroxine) are almost vertically aligned in the mass and molar images. Adrenocorticotropic hormone, on the other hand, with a molar mass of 4540, is 0.7 decades to the right in the mass image. Substances with molar mass below 1000g/mol (e.g. electrolytes and metabolites) would have "negative" distance, that is, masses deviating to the left. Many substances given in mass concentration are not given in molar amount because they haven't been added to the article.

The diagram above can also be used as an alternative way to convert any substance concentration (not only the normal or optimal ones) from molar to mass units and vice versa for those substances appearing in both scales, by measuring how much they are horizontally displaced from one another (representing the molar mass for that substance), and using the same distance from the concentration to be converted to determine the equivalent concentration in terms of the other unit. For example, on a certain monitor, the horizontal distance between the upper limits for parathyroid hormone in pmol/L and pg/mL may be 7 cm, with the mass concentration to the right. A molar concentration of, for example, 5 pmol/L would therefore correspond to a mass concentration located 7 cm to the right in the mass diagram, that is, approximately 45 pg/mL.

=== By units ===
Units do not necessarily imply anything about molarity or mass.

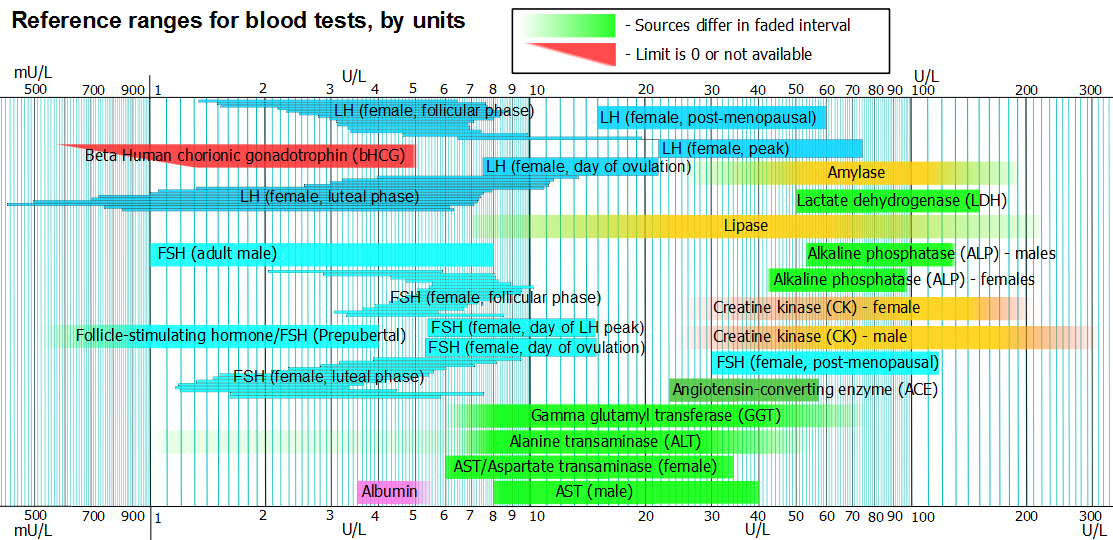

A few substances are below this main interval, e.g. thyroid stimulating hormone, being measured in mU/L, or above, like rheumatoid factor and CA19-9, being measured in U/mL.

=== By enzyme activity ===
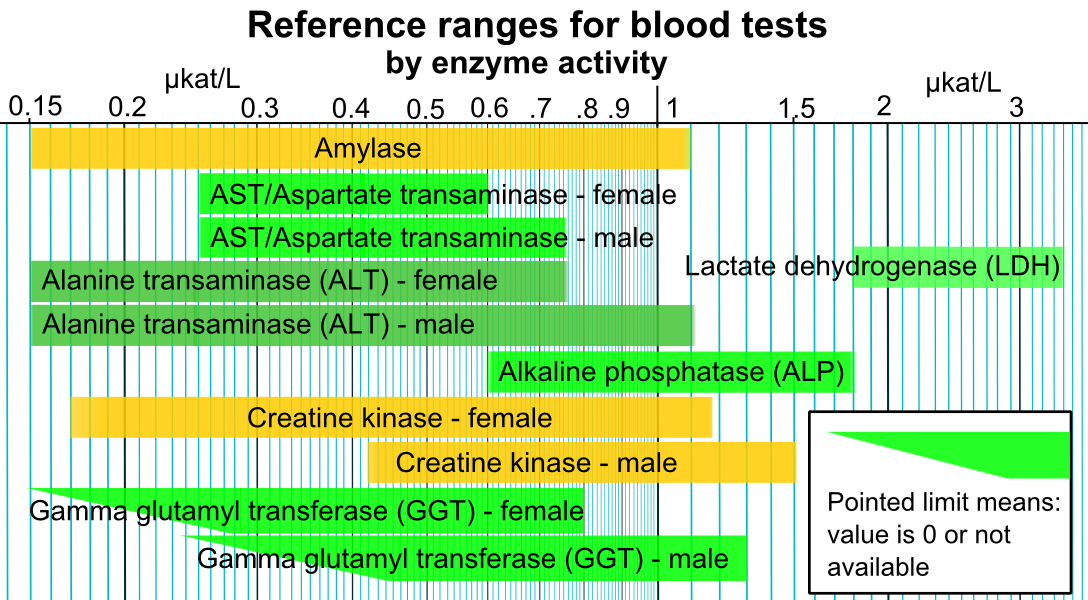

=== White blood cells ===
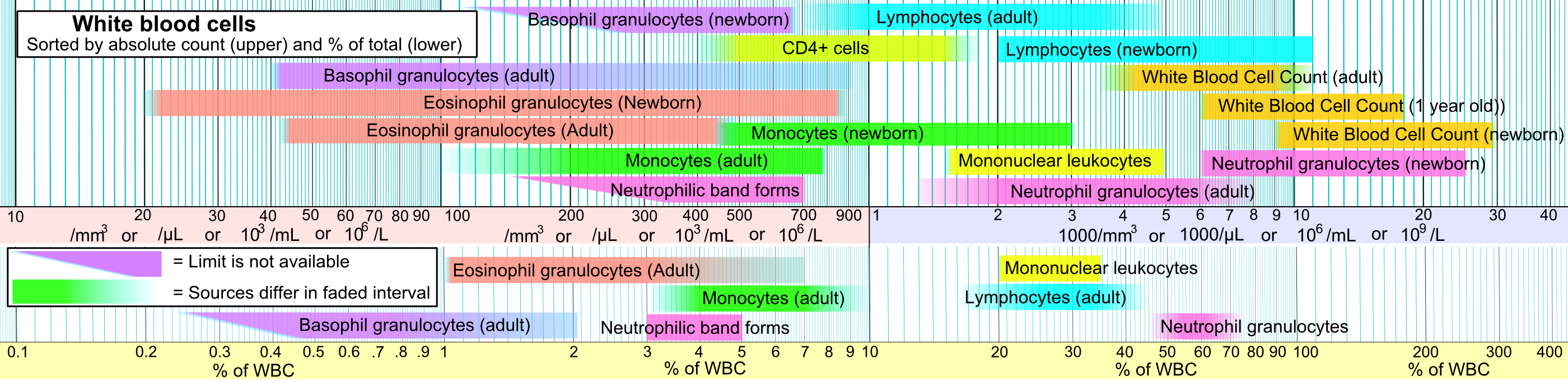

== Sorted by category ==
=== Ions and trace metals ===
Included here are also related binding proteins, like ferritin and transferrin for iron, and ceruloplasmin for copper.

Test	Lower limit	Upper limit	Unit*	Comments
Sodium (Na)	135, 137	145, 147	mmol/L or mEq/L	See hyponatremia or hypernatremia
Sodium (Na)	310, 320	330, 340	mg/dL	See hyponatremia or hypernatremia
Potassium (K)	3.5, 3.6	5.0, 5.1	mmol/L or mEq/L	See hypokalemia or hyperkalemia
Potassium (K)	14	20	mg/dL	See hypokalemia or hyperkalemia
Chloride (Cl)	95, 98, 100	105, 106, 110	mmol/L or mEq/L	See hypochloremia or hyperchloremia
Chloride (Cl)	340	370	mg/dL	See hypochloremia or hyperchloremia
Ionized calcium (Ca)	1.03, 1.10	1.23, 1.30	mmol/L	See hypocalcaemia or hypercalcaemia
Ionized calcium (Ca)	4.1, 4.4	4.9, 5.2	mg/dL	See hypocalcaemia or hypercalcaemia
Total calcium (Ca)	2.1, 2.2	2.5, 2.6, 2.8	mmol/L	
Total calcium (Ca)	8.4, 8.5	10.2, 10.5	mg/dL	
Total serum iron (TSI) – male	65, 76	176, 198	μg/dL	See hypoferremia or the following: iron overload (hemochromatosis), iron poisoning, siderosis, hemosiderosis, hyperferremia
Total serum iron (TSI) – male	11.6, 13.6	30, 32, 35	μmol/L	See hypoferremia or the following: iron overload (hemochromatosis), iron poisoning, siderosis, hemosiderosis, hyperferremia
Total serum iron (TSI) – female	26, 50	170	μg/dL	
Total serum iron (TSI) – female	4.6, 8.9	30.4	μmol/L	
Total serum iron (TSI) – newborns	100	250	μg/dL	
Total serum iron (TSI) – newborns	18	45	μmol/L	
Total serum iron (TSI) – children	50	120	μg/dL	
Total serum iron (TSI) – children	9	21	μmol/L	
Total iron-binding capacity (TIBC)	240, 262	450, 474	μg/dL	
Total iron-binding capacity (TIBC)	43, 47	81, 85	μmol/L	
Transferrin	190, 194, 204	326, 330, 360	mg/dL	
Transferrin	25	45	μmol/L	
Transferrin saturation	20	50	%	
Ferritin – Males and postmenopausal females	12	300	ng/mL or μg/L	
Ferritin – Males and postmenopausal females	27	670	pmol/L	
Ferritin – premenopausal females	12	150 – 200	ng/mL or μg/L	
Ferritin – premenopausal females	27	330 – 440	pmol/L	
Ammonia	10, 20	35, 65	μmol/L	See hypoammonemia and hyperammonemia
Ammonia	17, 34	60, 110	μg/dL	See hypoammonemia and hyperammonemia
Copper (Cu)	70	150	μg/dL	See hypocupremia or hypercupremia
Copper (Cu)	11	24	μmol/L	See hypocupremia or hypercupremia
Ceruloplasmin	15	60	mg/dL	
Ceruloplasmin	1	4	μmol/L	
Phosphate (HPO_{4}^{2−})	0.8	1.5	mmol/L	See hypophosphatemia or hyperphosphatemia
Inorganic phosphorus (serum)	1.0	1.5	mmol/L	
Inorganic phosphorus (serum)	3.0	4.5	mg/dL	
Zinc (Zn)	60, 72	110, 130	μg/dL	See zinc deficiency or zinc poisoning
Zinc (Zn)	9.2, 11	17, 20	μmol/L	See zinc deficiency or zinc poisoning
Magnesium	1.5, 1.7	2.0, 2.3	mEq/L or mg/dL	See hypomagnesemia or hypermagnesemia
Magnesium	0.6, 0.7	0.82, 0.95	mmol/L	See hypomagnesemia or hypermagnesemia

- Note: Although 'mEq' for mass and 'mEq/L' are sometimes used in the United States and elsewhere, they are not part of SI and are now considered redundant.

=== Acid–base and blood gases ===
If arterial/venous is not specified for an acid–base or blood gas value, then it generally refers to arterial, and not venous which otherwise is standard for other blood tests.

Acid–base and blood gases are among the few blood constituents that exhibit substantial difference between arterial and venous values. Still, pH, bicarbonate and base excess show a high level of inter-method reliability between arterial and venous tests, so arterial and venous values are roughly equivalent for these.

Test	Arterial/Venous	Lower limit	Upper limit	Unit
pH	Arterial	7.34, 7.35	7.44, 7.45	
pH	Venous	7.31	7.41	
[H^{+}]	Arterial	36	44	nmol/L
[H^{+}]	Arterial	3.6	4.4	ng/dL
Base excess	Arterial & venous	−3	+3	mEq/L
Oxygen partial pressure (pO_{2})	Arterial pO_{2}	10, 11	13, 14	kPa
Oxygen partial pressure (pO_{2})	Arterial pO_{2}	75, 83	100, 105	mmHg or torr
Oxygen partial pressure (pO_{2})	Venous	4.0	5.3	kPa
Oxygen partial pressure (pO_{2})	Venous	30	40	mmHg or torr
Oxygen saturation	Arterial	94, 95, 96	100	%
Oxygen saturation	Venous	Approximately 75		%
Carbon dioxide partial pressure (pCO_{2})	Arterial P_{a}CO_{2}	4.4, 4.7	5.9, 6.0	kPa
Carbon dioxide partial pressure (pCO_{2})	Arterial P_{a}CO_{2}	33, 35	44, 45	mmHg or torr
Carbon dioxide partial pressure (pCO_{2})	Venous	5.5,	6.8	kPa
Carbon dioxide partial pressure (pCO_{2})	Venous	41	51	mmHg or torr
Absolute content of carbon dioxide (CO_{2})	Arterial	23	30	mmol/L
Absolute content of carbon dioxide (CO_{2})	Arterial	100	132	mg/dL
Bicarbonate (HCO_{3}^{−})	Arterial & venous	18	23	mmol/L
Bicarbonate (HCO_{3}^{−})	Arterial & venous	110	140	mg/dL
Standard bicarbonate (SBC_{e})	Arterial & venous	21, 22	27, 28	mmol/L or mEq/L
Standard bicarbonate (SBC_{e})	Arterial & venous	134	170	mg/dL

=== Liver function ===
Test	Patient type	Lower limit	Upper limit	Unit	Comments
Total protein (TotPro)		60, 63	78, 82, 84	g/L	See serum total protein Interpretation
Albumin		35	48, 55	g/L	See hypoalbuminemia
Albumin		3.5	4.8, 5.5	U/L	See hypoalbuminemia
Albumin		540	740	μmol/L	See hypoalbuminemia
Globulins		23	35	g/L	
Total bilirubin		1.7, 2, 3.4, 5	17, 22, 25	μmol/L	
Total bilirubin		0.1, 0.2, 0.29	1.0, 1.3, 1.4	mg/dL	
Direct/conjugated bilirubin		0.0 or N/A	5, 7	μmol/L	
Direct/conjugated bilirubin		0	0.3, 0.4	mg/dL	
Alanine transaminase (ALT/ALAT)		5, 7, 8	20, 21, 56	U/L	Also called serum glutamic pyruvic transaminase (SGPT)
Alanine transaminase (ALT/ALAT)	Female	0.15	0.75	μkat/L	Also called serum glutamic pyruvic transaminase (SGPT)
Alanine transaminase (ALT/ALAT)	Male	0.15	1.1	μkat/L	Also called serum glutamic pyruvic transaminase (SGPT)
Aspartate transaminase (AST/ASAT)	Female	6	34	IU/L	Also called serum glutamic oxaloacetic transaminase (SGOT)
Aspartate transaminase (AST/ASAT)	Female	0.25	0.60	μkat/L	Also called serum glutamic oxaloacetic transaminase (SGOT)
Aspartate transaminase (AST/ASAT)	Male	8	40	IU/L	Also called serum glutamic oxaloacetic transaminase (SGOT)
Aspartate transaminase (AST/ASAT)	Male	0.25	0.75	μkat/L	Also called serum glutamic oxaloacetic transaminase (SGOT)
Alkaline phosphatase (ALP)		0.6	1.8	μkat/L	
Alkaline phosphatase (ALP)	Female	42	98	U/L	
Alkaline phosphatase (ALP)	Male	53	128	U/L	
Gamma glutamyl transferase (GGT)		5, 8	40, 78	U/L	
Gamma glutamyl transferase (GGT)	Female		0.63	μkat/L	
Gamma glutamyl transferase (GGT)	Male		0.92	μkat/L	

=== Cardiac tests ===
Test	Patient type	Lower limit	Upper limit	Unit	Comments
Creatine kinase (CK)	Male	24, 38, 60	174, 320	U/L or ng/mL	
Creatine kinase (CK)	Male	0.42	1.5	μkat/L	
Creatine kinase (CK)	Female	24, 38, 96	140, 200	U/L or ng/mL	
Creatine kinase (CK)	Female	0.17	1.17	μkat/L	
CK-MB		0	3, 3.8, 5	ng/mL or μg/L	
Myoglobin	Female	1	66	ng/mL or μg/L	
Myoglobin	Male	17	106	ng/mL or μg/L	
Cardiac troponin T (low sensitive)			0.1	ng/mL	99th percentile cutoff
Cardiac troponin I (high sensitive)			0.03	ng/mL	99th percentile cutoff
Cardiac troponin T (high sensitive)	Male		0.022	ng/mL	99th percentile cutoff
Cardiac troponin T (high sensitive)	Female		0.014	ng/mL	99th percentile cutoff
Cardiac troponin T (high sensitive)	newborn/infants		not established		more than adults

Brain natriuretic peptide (BNP) -more detailed ranges in BNP article
Interpretation	Range / Cutoff
Congestive heart failure unlikely	< 100 pg/mL
"Gray zone"	100–500 pg/mL
Congestive heart failure likely	> 500 pg/mL

NT-proBNP -more detailed ranges in NT-proBNP article
Interpretation	Age	Cutoff
Congestive heart failure likely	< 75 years	> 125 pg/mL
Congestive heart failure likely	> 75 years	> 450pg/mL

=== Lipids ===
Test	Patient type	Lower limit	Upper limit	Unit	Therapeutic target
Triglycerides	10–39 years	54	110	mg/dL	< 100 mg/dL or 1.1 mmol/L
Triglycerides	10–39 years	0.61	1.2	mmol/L	< 100 mg/dL or 1.1 mmol/L
Triglycerides	40–59 years	70	150	mg/dL	< 100 mg/dL or 1.1 mmol/L
Triglycerides	40–59 years	0.77	1.7	mmol/L	< 100 mg/dL or 1.1 mmol/L
Triglycerides	> 60 years	80	150	mg/dL	< 100 mg/dL or 1.1 mmol/L
Triglycerides	> 60 years	0.9	1.7	mmol/L	< 100 mg/dL or 1.1 mmol/L
Total cholesterol		3.0, 3.6	5.0, 6.5	mmol/L	< 3.9 mmol/L
Total cholesterol		120, 140	200, 250	mg/dL	< 150 mg/dL
HDL cholesterol	Female	1.0, 1.2, 1.3	2.2	mmol/L	> 1.0 or 1.6 mmol/L; 40 or 60 mg/dL
HDL cholesterol	Female	40, 50	86	mg/dL	> 1.0 or 1.6 mmol/L; 40 or 60 mg/dL
HDL cholesterol	Male	0.9	2.0	mmol/L	> 1.0 or 1.6 mmol/L; 40 or 60 mg/dL
HDL cholesterol	Male	35	80	mg/dL	> 1.0 or 1.6 mmol/L; 40 or 60 mg/dL
LDL cholesterol (Not valid when triglycerides >5.0 mmol/L)		2.0, 2.4	3.0, 3.4	mmol/L	< 2.5 mmol/L
LDL cholesterol (Not valid when triglycerides >5.0 mmol/L)		80, 94	120, 130	mg/dL	< 100 mg/dL
LDL/HDL quotient		n/a	5	(unitless)	

=== Tumour markers ===
Test	Patient type	Cutoff	Unit	Comments
Alpha fetoprotein (AFP)		44	ng/mL or μg/L	Hepatocellular carcinoma or testicular cancer
Beta human chorionic gonadotrophin (β-hCG)	In males and non-pregnant females	5	IU/L or mU/mL	choriocarcinoma
CA19-9		40	U/mL	Pancreatic cancer
CA-125		30, 35	kU/L or U/mL	
Carcinoembryonic antigen (CEA)	Non-smokers, 50 years	3.4, 3.6	μg/L	
Carcinoembryonic antigen (CEA)	Non-smokers, 70 years	4.1	μg/L	
Carcinoembryonic antigen (CEA)	Smokers	5	μg/L	
Prostate specific antigen (PSA)	40–49 years	1.2–2.9	μg/L or ng/mL	More detailed cutoffs in PSA – Serum levels
Prostate specific antigen (PSA)	70–79 years, non-African-American	4.0–9.0	μg/L or ng/mL	More detailed cutoffs in PSA – Serum levels
Prostate specific antigen (PSA)	70–79 years, African-American	7.7–13	μg/L or ng/mL	More detailed cutoffs in PSA – Serum levels
PAP		3	units/dL (Bodansky units)	
Calcitonin		5, 15	ng/L or pg/mL	Cutoff against medullary thyroid cancer More detailed cutoffs in Calcitonin article

=== Endocrinology ===
==== Thyroid hormones ====
Test	Patient type	Lower limit	Upper limit	Unit
Thyroid stimulating hormone (TSH or thyrotropin)	Adults – standard range	0.3, 0.4, 0.5, 0.6	4.0, 4.5, 6.0	mIU/L or μIU/mL
Thyroid stimulating hormone (TSH or thyrotropin)	Adults – optimal range	0.3, 0.5	2.0, 3.0	mIU/L or μIU/mL
Thyroid stimulating hormone (TSH or thyrotropin)	Infants	1.3	19	mIU/L or μIU/mL
Free thyroxine (FT4) -more detailed ranges in Thyroid function tests article	Normal adult	0.7, 0.8	1.4, 1.5, 1.8	ng/dL
Free thyroxine (FT4) -more detailed ranges in Thyroid function tests article	Normal adult	9, 10, 12	18, 23	pmol/L
Free thyroxine (FT4) -more detailed ranges in Thyroid function tests article	Child/Adolescent; 31 d – 18 y	0.8	2.0	ng/dL
Free thyroxine (FT4) -more detailed ranges in Thyroid function tests article	Child/Adolescent; 31 d – 18 y	10	26	pmol/L
Free thyroxine (FT4) -more detailed ranges in Thyroid function tests article	Pregnant	0.5	1.0	ng/dL
Free thyroxine (FT4) -more detailed ranges in Thyroid function tests article	Pregnant	6.5	13	pmol/L
Total thyroxine		4, 5.5	11, 12.3	μg/dL
Total thyroxine		60	140, 160	nmol/L
Free triiodothyronine (FT3)	Normal adult	0.2	0.5	ng/dL
Free triiodothyronine (FT3)	Normal adult	3.1	7.7	pmol/L
Free triiodothyronine (FT3)	Children 2-16 y	0.1	0.6	ng/dL
Free triiodothyronine (FT3)	Children 2-16 y	1.5	9.2	pmol/L
Total triiodothyronine		60, 75	175, 181	ng/dL
Total triiodothyronine		0.9, 1.1	2.5, 2.7	nmol/L
Thyroxine-binding globulin (TBG)		12	30	mg/L
Thyroglobulin (Tg)		1.5	30	pmol/L
Thyroglobulin (Tg)		1	20	μg/L

==== Sex hormones ====
The diagrams below take inter-cycle and inter-woman variability into account in displaying reference ranges for estradiol, progesterone, FSH and LH.

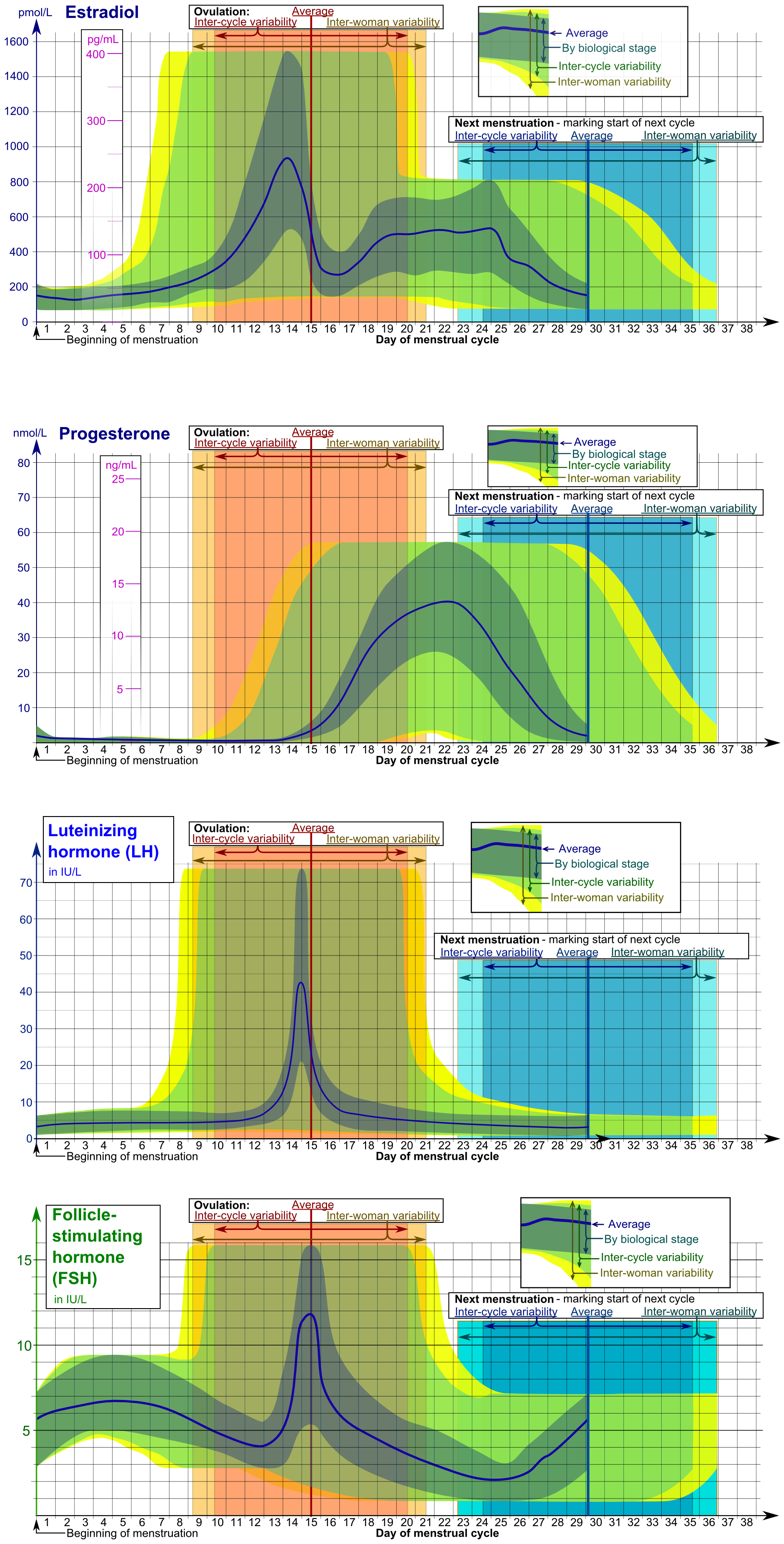
Levels of estradiol (the main estrogen), progesterone, luteinizing hormone and follicle-stimulating hormone during the menstrual cycle.

Test	Patient type	Lower limit	Upper limit	Unit
Dihydrotestosterone	adult male	1.0	2.9	nmol/L
Dihydrotestosterone	adult male	30	85	ng/dL
Testosterone	Male, overall	8, 10	27, 35	nmol/L
Testosterone	Male, overall	230, 300	780–1000	ng/dL
Testosterone	Male < 50 years	10	45	nmol/L
Testosterone	Male < 50 years	290	1300	ng/dL
Testosterone	Male > 50 years	6.2	26	nmol/L
Testosterone	Male > 50 years	180	740	ng/dL
Testosterone	Female	0.7	2.8–3.0	nmol/L
Testosterone	Female	20	80–85	ng/dL
17α-Hydroxyprogesterone	male	0.06	3.0	mg/L
17α-Hydroxyprogesterone	male	0.18	9.1	μmol/L
17α-Hydroxyprogesterone	Female (Follicular phase)	0.2	1.0	mg/L
17α-Hydroxyprogesterone	Female (Follicular phase)	0.6	3.0	μmol/L
Follicle-stimulating hormone (FSH) -more detailed menstrual cycle ranges in separate diagram	Prepubertal	<1	3	IU/L
Follicle-stimulating hormone (FSH) -more detailed menstrual cycle ranges in separate diagram	Adult male	1	8	IU/L
Follicle-stimulating hormone (FSH) -more detailed menstrual cycle ranges in separate diagram	Adult female (follicular and luteal phase)	1	11	IU/L
Follicle-stimulating hormone (FSH) -more detailed menstrual cycle ranges in separate diagram	Adult female (Ovulation)	6; 95% PI (standard)	26; 95% PI)	IU/L
Follicle-stimulating hormone (FSH) -more detailed menstrual cycle ranges in separate diagram	Adult female (Ovulation)	5; 90% PI (used in diagram)	15 (90% PI)	IU/L
Follicle-stimulating hormone (FSH) -more detailed menstrual cycle ranges in separate diagram	Post-menopausal female	30	118	IU/L
Luteinizing hormone (LH) -more detailed menstrual cycle ranges in separate diagram	Female, peak	20; 90% PI (used in diagram)	75 (90% PI)	IU/L
Luteinizing hormone (LH) -more detailed menstrual cycle ranges in separate diagram	Female, post-menopausal	15	60	IU/L
Luteinizing hormone (LH) -more detailed menstrual cycle ranges in separate diagram	Male aged 18+	2	9	IU/L
Estradiol (an estrogen) -more detailed ranges in estradiol article	Adult male	50	200	pmol/L
Estradiol (an estrogen) -more detailed ranges in estradiol article	Adult male	14	55	pg/mL
Estradiol (an estrogen) -more detailed ranges in estradiol article	Adult female (day 5 of follicular phase, and luteal phase)	70	500, 600	pmol/L
Estradiol (an estrogen) -more detailed ranges in estradiol article	Adult female (day 5 of follicular phase, and luteal phase)	19	140, 160	pg/mL
Estradiol (an estrogen) -more detailed ranges in estradiol article	Adult female – free (not protein bound)	0.5	9	pg/mL
Estradiol (an estrogen) -more detailed ranges in estradiol article	Adult female – free (not protein bound)	1.7	33	pmol/L
Estradiol (an estrogen) -more detailed ranges in estradiol article	Post-menopausal female	0	130	pmol/L
Estradiol (an estrogen) -more detailed ranges in estradiol article	Post-menopausal female	0	35	pg/mL
Progesterone -more detailed ranges in Progesterone article	Female in mid-luteal phase (day 21–23)	17, 35	92	nmol/L
Progesterone -more detailed ranges in Progesterone article	Female in mid-luteal phase (day 21–23)	6, 11	29	ng/mL
Androstenedione	Adult male and female	60	270	ng/dL
Androstenedione	Post-menopausal female		< 180	ng/dL
Androstenedione	Prepubertal		< 60	ng/dL
Dehydroepiandrosterone sulfate -more detailed ranges in DHEA-S article	Adult male and female	30	400	μg/dL
SHBG -more detailed ranges in SHBG article	Adult female	40	120	nmol/L
SHBG -more detailed ranges in SHBG article	Adult male	20	60	nmol/L
Anti-Müllerian hormone (AMH) -more detailed ranges in AMH article	13–45 years	0.7	20	ng/mL
Anti-Müllerian hormone (AMH) -more detailed ranges in AMH article	13–45 years	5	140	pmol/L

==== Other hormones ====
Test	Patient type	Lower limit	Upper limit	Unit
Adrenocorticotropic hormone (ACTH)		2.2	13.3	pmol/L
Adrenocorticotropic hormone (ACTH)		20	100	pg/mL
Cortisol	09:00 am	140	700	nmol/L
Cortisol	09:00 am	5	25	μg/dL
Cortisol	Midnight	80	350	nmol/L
Cortisol	Midnight	2.9	13	μg/dL
Growth hormone (fasting)		0	5	ng/mL
Growth hormone (arginine stimulation)		7	n/a	ng/mL
IGF-1 -more detailed ranges in IGF-1 article	Female, 20 yrs	110	420	ng/mL
IGF-1 -more detailed ranges in IGF-1 article	Female, 75 yrs	55	220	ng/mL
IGF-1 -more detailed ranges in IGF-1 article	Male, 20 yrs	160	390	ng/mL
IGF-1 -more detailed ranges in IGF-1 article	Male, 75 yrs	48	200	ng/mL
Prolactin -more detailed ranges in Prolactin article	Female	71, 105	348, 548	mIU/L
Prolactin -more detailed ranges in Prolactin article	Female	3.4, 3.9	16.4, 20.3	μg/L
Prolactin -more detailed ranges in Prolactin article	Male	58, 89	277, 365	mIU/L
Prolactin -more detailed ranges in Prolactin article	Male	2.7, 3.3	13.0, 13.5	μg/L
Parathyroid hormone (PTH)		10, 17	65, 70	pg/mL
Parathyroid hormone (PTH)		1.1, 1.8	6.9, 7.5	pmol/L
25-hydroxycholecalciferol (a vitamin D) – Standard reference range		8, 9	40, 80	ng/mL
25-hydroxycholecalciferol (a vitamin D) – Standard reference range		20, 23	95, 150	nmol/L
25-hydroxycholecalciferol – Therapeutic target range		30, 40	65, 100	ng/mL
25-hydroxycholecalciferol – Therapeutic target range		85, 100	120, 160	nmol/L
Plasma renin activity		0.29, 1.9	3.7	ng/(mL·h)
Plasma renin activity		3.3, 21	41	mcU/mL
Aldosterone -more detailed ranges in Aldosterone article	Adult		19, 34.0	ng/dL
Aldosterone -more detailed ranges in Aldosterone article	Adult		530, 940	pmol/L
Aldosterone-to-renin ratio -more detailed ranges in Aldosterone/renin ratio article	Adult		13.1, 35.0	ng/dL per ng/(mL·h)
Aldosterone-to-renin ratio -more detailed ranges in Aldosterone/renin ratio article	Adult		360, 970	pmol/liter per μg/(L·h)

=== Vitamins ===
Also including the vitamin B_{12})-related amino acid homocysteine.

Test	Patient type	Standard range		Optimal range		Unit
Test	Patient type	Lower limit	Upper limit	Lower limit	Upper limit	Unit
Vitamin A		30	65			μg/dL
Vitamin B_{9} (Folic acid/Folate) – Serum	Age > 1 year	3.0	16	5		ng/mL or μg/L
Vitamin B_{9} (Folic acid/Folate) – Serum	Age > 1 year	6.8	36	11		nmol/L
Vitamin B_{9} (Folic acid/Folate) – Red blood cells		200	600			ng/mL or μg/L
Vitamin B_{9} (Folic acid/Folate) – Red blood cells		450	1400			nmol/L
Vitamin B_{9} (Folic acid/Folate) – Red blood cells	Pregnant			400		ng/mL or μg/L
Vitamin B_{9} (Folic acid/Folate) – Red blood cells	Pregnant			900		nmol/L
Vitamin B_{12} (Cobalamin)		130, 160	700, 950			ng/L
Vitamin B_{12} (Cobalamin)		100, 120	520, 700			pmol/L
Homocysteine -more detailed ranges in Homocysteine article		3.3, 5.9	7.2, 15.3		6.3	μmol/L
Homocysteine -more detailed ranges in Homocysteine article		45, 80	100, 210		85	μg/dL
Vitamin C (Ascorbic acid)		0.4	1.5	0.9		mg/dL
Vitamin C (Ascorbic acid)		23	85	50		μmol/L
25-hydroxycholecalciferol (a vitamin D)		8, 9	40, 80	30, 40	65, 100	ng/mL
25-hydroxycholecalciferol (a vitamin D)		20, 23	95, 150	85, 100	120, 160	nmol/L
Vitamin E				28		μmol/L
Vitamin E				1.2		mg/dL

=== Toxic Substances ===
Test	Limit type	Limit	Unit
Lead	Optimal health range	< 20 or 40	μg/dL
Blood ethanol content	Limit for drunk driving	0, 0.2, 0.8	‰ or g/L
Blood ethanol content	Limit for drunk driving	17.4	mmol/L

=== Hematology ===
==== Red blood cells ====
These values (except Hemoglobin in plasma) are for total blood and not only blood plasma.

Test	Patient	Lower limit	Upper limit	Unit	Comments
Hemoglobin (Hb)	Male	2.0, 2.1	2.5, 2.7	mmol/L	Higher in neonates, lower in children.
Hemoglobin (Hb)	Male	130, 132, 135	162, 170, 175	g/L	Higher in neonates, lower in children.
Hemoglobin (Hb)	Female	1.8, 1.9	2.3, 2.5	mmol/L	Sex difference negligible until adulthood.
Hemoglobin (Hb)	Female	120	150, 152, 160	g/L	Sex difference negligible until adulthood.
Hemoglobin subunits (sometimes displayed simply as "Hemoglobin")	Male	8.0, 8.4	10.0, 10.8	mmol/L	4 per hemoglobin molecule
Hemoglobin subunits (sometimes displayed simply as "Hemoglobin")	Female	7.2, 7.6	9.2, 10.0	mmol/L	4 per hemoglobin molecule
Hemoglobin in plasma		0.16	0.62	μmol/L	Normally diminutive compared with inside red blood cells
Hemoglobin in plasma		1	4	mg/dL	Normally diminutive compared with inside red blood cells
Glycated hemoglobin (Hb_{A1c})	< 50 years	3.6	5.0	% of Hb	
Glycated hemoglobin (Hb_{A1c})	> 50 years	3.9	5.3	% of Hb	
Haptoglobin	< 50 years	0.35	1.9	g/L	
Haptoglobin	> 50 years	0.47	2.1	g/L	
Hematocrit (Hct)	Male	0.39, 0.4, 0.41, 0.45	0.50, 0.52, 0.53, 0.62	L/L	
Hematocrit (Hct)	Female	0.35, 0.36, 0.37	0.46, 0.48	L/L	
Hematocrit (Hct)	Child	0.31	0.43	L/L	
Mean corpuscular volume (MCV)	Male	76, 82	100, 102	fL	Cells are larger in neonates, though smaller in other children.
Mean corpuscular volume (MCV)	Female	78	101	fL	Cells are larger in neonates, though smaller in other children.
Red blood cell distribution width (RDW)		11.5	14.5	%	
Mean cell hemoglobin (MCH)		0.39	0.54	fmol/cell	
Mean cell hemoglobin (MCH)		25, 27	32, 33, 35	pg/cell	
Mean corpuscular hemoglobin concentration (MCHC)		4.8, 5.0	5.4, 5.6	mmol/L	
Mean corpuscular hemoglobin concentration (MCHC)		31, 32	35, 36	g/dL or % (Note: The MCHC in g/dL and the mass fraction of hemoglobin in red blood cells in % are numerically identical in practice, assuming a RBC density of 1g/mL and negligible hemoglobin in plasma.)	
Erythrocytes/Red blood cells (RBC)	Male	4.2, 4.3	5.7, 5.9, 6.2, 6.9	×10^{12}/L or million/mm^{3}	
Erythrocytes/Red blood cells (RBC)	Female	3.5, 3.8, 3.9	5.1, 5.5	×10^{12}/L or million/mm^{3}	
Erythrocytes/Red blood cells (RBC)	Infant/Child	3.8	5.5	×10^{12}/L or million/mm^{3}	
Reticulocytes	Adult	26	130	×10^{9}/L	
Reticulocytes	Adult	0.5	1.5	% of RBC	
Reticulocytes	Newborn	1.1	4.5	% of RBC	
Reticulocytes	Infant	0.5	3.1	% of RBC	
Immature reticulocyte fraction (IRF)	Adult	1.6	12.1	% of reticulocytes	
Reticulocyte hemoglobin equivalent	Adult	30.0	37.6	%	
Reticulocyte hemoglobin equivalent	Adult	24.1	35.8	pg	
Immature platelet fraction (IPF)	Adult	0.8	5.6	%	

==== White blood cells ====
These values are for total blood and not only blood plasma.

Test	Patient type	Lower limit	Upper limit	Unit
White Blood Cell Count (WBC)	Adult	3.5, 3.9, 4.1, 4.5	9.0, 10.0, 10.9, 11	×10^{9}/L; ×10^{3}/mm^{3} or; ×10^{3}/μL
White Blood Cell Count (WBC)	Newborn	9	30	×10^{9}/L; ×10^{3}/mm^{3} or; ×10^{3}/μL
White Blood Cell Count (WBC)	1 year old	6	18	×10^{9}/L; ×10^{3}/mm^{3} or; ×10^{3}/μL
Neutrophil granulocytes (A.K.A. grans, polys, PMNs, or segs)	Adult	1.3, 1.8, 2	5.4, 7, 8	×10^{9}/L
Neutrophil granulocytes (A.K.A. grans, polys, PMNs, or segs)	Adult	45–54	62, 74	% of WBC
Neutrophil granulocytes (A.K.A. grans, polys, PMNs, or segs)	Newborn	6	26	×10^{9}/L
Neutrophilic band forms	Adult		0.7	×10^{9}/L
Neutrophilic band forms	Adult	3	5	% of WBC
Lymphocytes	Adult	0.7, 1.0	3.5, 3.9, 4.8	×10^{9}/L
Lymphocytes	Adult	16–25	33, 45	% of WBC
Lymphocytes	Newborn	2	11	×10^{9}/L
Monocytes	Adult	0.1, 0.2	0.8	×10^{9}/L
Monocytes	Adult	3, 4.0	7, 10	% of WBC
Monocytes	Newborn	0.4	3.1	×10^{9}/L
Mononuclear leukocytes (Lymphocytes + monocytes)	Adult	1.5	5	×10^{9}/L
Mononuclear leukocytes (Lymphocytes + monocytes)	Adult	20	35	% of WBC
CD4^{+} T cells	Adult	0.4, 0.5	1.5, 1.8	×10^{9}/L
Eosinophil granulocytes	Adult	0.0, 0.04	0.44, 0.45, 0.5	×10^{9}/L
Eosinophil granulocytes	Adult	1	3, 7	% of WBC
Eosinophil granulocytes	Newborn	0.02	0.85	×10^{9}/L
Basophil granulocytes	Adult	40	100, 200, 900	×10^{6}/L
Basophil granulocytes	Adult	0.0	0.75, 2	% of WBC
Basophil granulocytes	Newborn		0.64	×10^{9}/L

==== Coagulation ====
Test	Lower limit	Upper limit	Unit	Comments
Thrombocyte/Platelet count (Plt)	140, 150	350, 400, 450	×10^{9}/L or x1000/μL	
Mean platelet volume (MPV)	7.2, 7.4, 7.5	10.4, 11.5, 11.7	fL	
Prothrombin time (PT)	10, 11, 12	13, 13.5, 14, 15	s	PT reference varies between laboratory kits – INR is standardised
INR	0.9	1.2		The INR is a corrected ratio of a patient's PT to normal
Activated partial thromboplastin time (APTT)	18, 30	28, 42, 45	s	
Thrombin clotting time (TCT)	11	18	s	
Fibrinogen	1.7, 2.0	3.6, 4.2	g/L	
Antithrombin	0.80	1.2	kIU/L	
Antithrombin	0.15, 0.17	0.2, 0.39	mg/mL	
Bleeding time	2	9	minutes	
Viscosity	1.5	1.72	cP	

=== Immunology ===
==== Acute phase proteins ====
Acute phase proteins are markers of inflammation.

Test	Patient	Lower limit	Upper limit	Unit	Comments
Erythrocyte sedimentation rate (ESR)	Male	0	Age÷2	mm/h	ESR increases with age and tends to be higher in females.
Erythrocyte sedimentation rate (ESR)	Female	0	(Age+10)÷2	mm/h	ESR increases with age and tends to be higher in females.
C-reactive protein (CRP)			5, 6	mg/L	
C-reactive protein (CRP)			200, 240	nmol/L	
Alpha 1-antitrypsin (AAT)		20, 22	38, 53	μmol/L	
Alpha 1-antitrypsin (AAT)		89, 97	170, 230	mg/dL	
Procalcitonin			0.15	ng/mL or μg/L	

==== Isotypes of antibodies ====
Test	Patient	Lower limit	Upper limit	Unit
IgA	Adult	70, 110	360, 560	mg/dL
IgD	Adult	0.5	3.0	mg/dL
IgE	Adult	0.01	0.04	mg/dL
IgG	Adult	800	1800	mg/dL
IgM	Adult	54	220	mg/dL

==== Autoantibodies ====
Autoantibodies are usually absent or very low, so instead of being given in standard reference ranges, the values usually denote where they are said to be present, or whether the test is a positive test. There may also be an equivocal interval, where it is uncertain whether there is a significantly increased level.

Test	Negative	Equivocal	Positive	Unit
anti-SS-A (Ro)	< 1.0	n/a	≥ 1.0	Units (U)
anti-SS-B (La)	< 1.0	n/a	≥ 1.0	Units (U)
Anti ds-DNA	< 30.0	30.0–75.0	> 75.0	International Units per millilitre (IU/mL)
Anti ss-DNA	< 8	8–10	> 10	Units per millilitre (U/mL)
Anti-histone antibodies	< 25	n/a	> 25	Units per millilitre (U/mL)
Cytoplasmic anti-neutrophil cytoplasmic antibodies (c-ANCA)	< 20	21–30	> 30	Units per millilitre (U/mL)
Perinuclear anti-neutrophil cytoplasmic antibodies (p-ANCA)	< 5	n/a	> 5	Units per millilitre (U/mL)
Anti-mitochondrial antibodies (AMA)	< 0.1	0.1-0.9	≥ 1.0	Units (U)
Rheumatoid factor (RF)	< 20	20–30	> 30	Units per millilitre (U/mL)
Antistreptolysin O titre (ASOT) in preschoolers			> 100	Units per millilitre (U/mL)
ASOT at school age			> 250	Units per millilitre (U/mL)
ASOT in adults			> 125	Units per millilitre (U/mL)

Test	Negative	Low/weak positive	Moderate positive	High/strong positive	Unit
Anti-phospholipid IgG	< 20	20–30	31–50	> 51	GPLU/mL
Anti-phospholipid IgM	< 1.5	1.5–2.5	2–9.9	> 10	MPL /mL
Anti-phospholipid IgA	< 10	10–20	21–30	> 31	arb U/mL
Anti-citrullinated protein antibodies	< 20	20–39	40–59	> 60	EU

==== Other immunology ====
Test	Lower limit	Upper limit	Unit
Serum free light chains (FLC): kappa/lambda ratio	0.26	1.65	(unitless)

=== Other enzymes and proteins ===
Test	Lower limit	Upper limit	Unit	Comments
Serum total protein	60, 63	78, 82, 84	g/L	Further information: Serum total protein § Interpretation
Lactate dehydrogenase (LDH)	50	150	U/L	
Lactate dehydrogenase (LDH)	0.4	1.7	μmol/L	
Lactate dehydrogenase (LDH)	1.8	3.4	μkat/L	< 70 years old
Amylase	25, 30, 53	110, 120, 123, 125, 190	U/L	
Amylase	0.15	1.1	μkat/L	
Amylase	200	240	nmol/L	
D-dimer -more detailed ranges in D-dimer article	n/a	500	ng/mL	Higher in pregnant women
D-dimer -more detailed ranges in D-dimer article	n/a	0.5	mg/L	Higher in pregnant women
Lipase	7, 10, 23	60, 150, 208	U/L	
Angiotensin-converting enzyme (ACE)	23	57	U/L	
Acid phosphatase		3.0	ng/mL	
Eosinophil cationic protein (ECP)	2.3	16	μg/L	

=== Other electrolytes and metabolites ===
Electrolytes and metabolites: For iron and copper, some related proteins are also included.

Test	Patient type	Lower limit	Upper limit	Unit	Comments
Osmolality		275, 280, 281	295, 296, 297	mOsm/kg	Plasma weight excludes solutes
Osmolarity		Slightly less than osmolality		mOsm/L	Plasma volume includes solutes
Urea		3.0	7.0	mmol/L	BUN – blood urea nitrogen
Urea		7	18, 21	mg/dL	BUN – blood urea nitrogen
* Uric acid		0.18	0.48	mmol/L	
* Uric acid	Female	2.0	7.0	mg/dL	
* Uric acid	Male	2.1	8.5	mg/dL	
Creatinine	Male	60, 68	90, 118	μmol/L	May be complemented with creatinine clearance
Creatinine	Male	0.7, 0.8	1.0, 1.3	mg/dL	May be complemented with creatinine clearance
Creatinine	Female	50, 68	90, 98	μmol/L	May be complemented with creatinine clearance
Creatinine	Female	0.6, 0.8	1.0, 1.1	mg/dL	May be complemented with creatinine clearance
BUN/Creatinine Ratio		5	35	–	
Plasma glucose (fasting)		3.8, 4.0	6.0, 6.1	mmol/L	See also glycated hemoglobin (in hematology)
Plasma glucose (fasting)		65, 70, 72	100, 110	mg/dL	See also glycated hemoglobin (in hematology)
Full blood glucose (fasting)		3.3	5.6	mmol/L	See also glycated hemoglobin (in hematology)
Full blood glucose (fasting)		60	100	mg/dL	See also glycated hemoglobin (in hematology)
Random glucose		3.9	7.8	mmol/L	See also glycated hemoglobin (in hematology)
Random glucose		70	140	mg/dL	See also glycated hemoglobin (in hematology)
Lactate (Venous)		4.5	19.8	mg/dL	
Lactate (Venous)		0.5	2.2	mmol/L	
Lactate (Arterial)		4.5	14.4	mg/dL	
Lactate (Arterial)		0.5	1.6	mmol/L	
Pyruvate		300	900	μg/dL	
Pyruvate		34	102	μmol/L	
Ketones			1	mg/dL	
Ketones			0.1	mmol/L	

== Medication ==
Test	Lower limit	Upper limit	Unit	Comments
Digoxin	0.5	2.0	ng/mL	Narrow therapeutic window
Digoxin	0.6	2.6	nmol/L	Narrow therapeutic window
Lithium	0.4, 0.5, 0.8	1.3	mmol/L	Narrow therapeutic window
Paracetamol		30	mg/L	Risk of paracetamol toxicity at higher levels
Paracetamol		200	μmol/L	Risk of paracetamol toxicity at higher levels

== See also ==
- Cardiology diagnostic tests and procedures
- Comprehensive metabolic panel
- Medical technologist
- Reference range
