= Serum iron =

- MedlinePlus: 003488

Serum iron is a medical laboratory test that measures the amount of circulating iron that is bound to transferrin and freely circulate in the blood. Clinicians order this laboratory test when they are concerned about iron deficiency, which can cause anemia and other problems. 65% of the iron in the body is bound up in hemoglobin molecules in red blood cells. About 4% is bound up in myoglobin molecules. Around 30% of the iron in the body is stored as ferritin or hemosiderin in the spleen, the bone marrow and the liver. Small amounts of iron can be found in other molecules in cells throughout the body. None of this iron is directly accessible by testing the serum.

However, some iron is circulating in the serum. Transferrin is a molecule produced by the liver that binds one or two iron(III) ions, i.e. ferric iron, Fe^{3+}; transferrin is essential if stored iron is to be moved and used. Most of the time, about 30% of the available sites on the transferrin molecule are filled. The test for serum iron uses blood drawn from veins to measure the iron ions that are bound to transferrin and circulating in the blood. This test should be done after 12 hours of fasting. The extent to which sites on transferrin molecules are filled by iron ions can be another helpful clinical indicator, known as percent transferrin saturation. Another lab test saturates the sample to measure the total amount of transferrin; this test is called total iron-binding capacity (TIBC). These three tests are generally done at the same time, and taken together are an important part of the diagnostic process for conditions such as anemia, iron deficiency anemia, anemia of chronic disease and haemochromatosis.

== Normal values ==
Normal reference ranges are:

- Serum iron:
  - Men: 65 to 176 μg/dL
  - Women: 50 to 170 μg/dL
  - Newborns: 100 to 250 μg/dL
  - Children: 50 to 120 μg/dL
- TIBC: 240–450 μg/dL
- Transferrin saturation: 20–50%

μg/dL = micrograms per deciliter.

Laboratories often use different units and "normal" may vary by population and the lab techniques used; look at the individual laboratory reference values to interpret a specific test (for instance, your own).

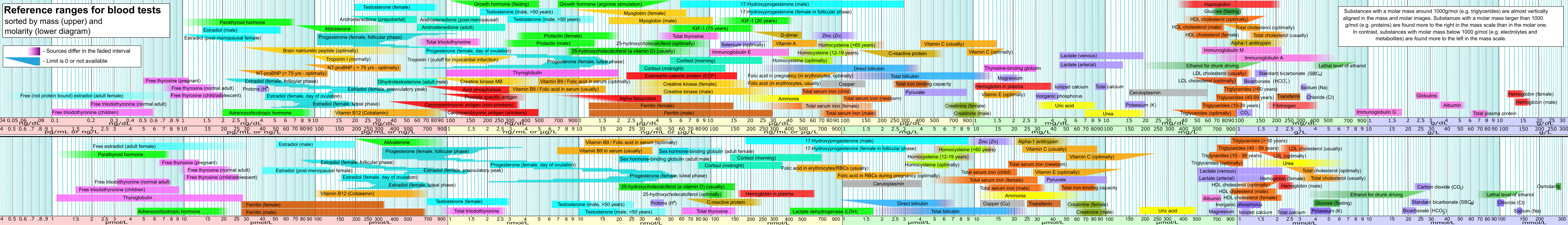
Reference ranges for blood tests, comparing blood content of iron and related compounds (shown in brown and orange) with other constituents.

== See also ==
- Human iron metabolism
