= Total iron-binding capacity =

Medical blood test to measure transferrin

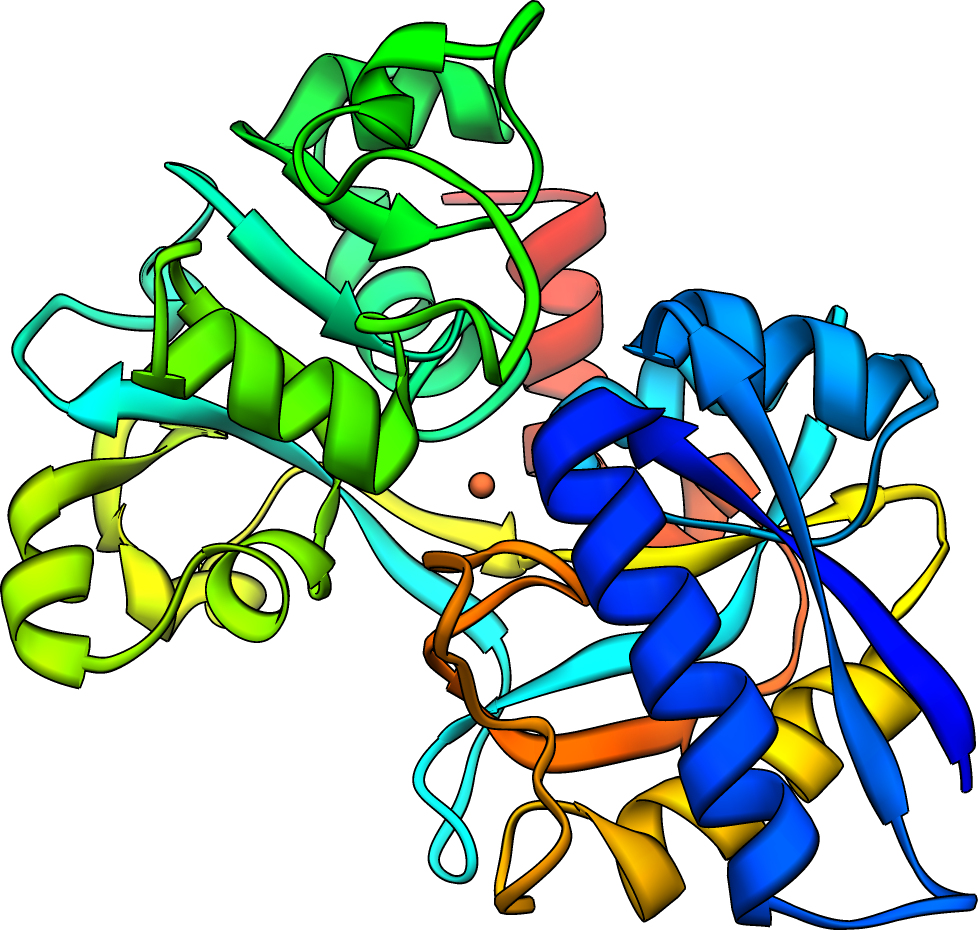
- The transferrin protein binds free iron and transports it in the blood.
- Synonyms: Transferrin iron-binding capacity
- MedlinePlus: 003489
- LOINC: 2500-7, 14800-7, 35215-3

Total iron-binding capacity (TIBC) or sometimes transferrin iron-binding capacity is a medical laboratory test that measures the blood's capacity to bind iron with transferrin. Transferrin can bind two atoms of ferric iron (Fe^{3+}) with high affinity. It means that transferrin has the capacity to transport approximately from 1.40 to 1.49 mg of iron per gram of transferrin present in the blood.

It is performed by drawing blood and measuring the maximum amount of iron that it can carry, which indirectly measures transferrin since transferrin is the most dynamic carrier. If TIBC values are known, the transferrin concentration can be estimated with the following formulas:

- Transferrin (mg/dL) = 0.8 x TIBC (μg of iron/dL) – 43
- Transferrin (mg/dL) = 0.7 x TIBC (μg of iron/dL)

To measure TIBC in the blood is less expensive than a direct measurement of transferrin.

The TIBC should not be confused with the unsaturated iron-binding capacity or UIBC (LOINC 2501-5, 22753-8 & 35216-1). The UIBC is calculated by subtracting the serum iron from the TIBC.

== Interpretation ==
Taken together with serum iron and percent transferrin saturation clinicians usually perform this test when they are concerned about anemia, iron deficiency or iron deficiency anemia. However, because the liver produces transferrin, alterations in function (such as cirrhosis, hepatitis, or liver failure) must be considered when performing this test. It can also be an indirect test of liver function, but is rarely used for this purpose.

The percent transferrin saturation (i.e., the result of the formula of serum iron/TIBC x 100) can also be a useful indicator. Studies also revealed that a transferrin saturation (serum iron concentration ÷ total iron binding capacity) over 60 percent in men and over 50 percent in women identified the presence of an abnormality in iron metabolism (hereditary hemochromatosis, heterozygotes and homozygotes) with approximately 95 percent accuracy. This finding helps in the early diagnosis of hereditary hemochromatosis, especially while serum ferritin still remains low. The retained iron in hereditary hemochromatosis is primarily deposited in parenchymal cells, with reticuloendothelial cell accumulation occurring very late in the disease. This is in contrast to transfusional iron overload in which iron deposition occurs first in the reticuloendothelial cells and then in parenchymal cells. This explains why ferritin levels remain relative low in hereditary hemochromatosis, while transferrin saturation is high.

Condition	Serum iron (highly variable)	Transferrin and TIBC	Percent transferrin saturation
Iron deficiency anemia	Low	High. The liver produces more transferrin, presumably attempting to maximize use of the little iron that is available.	Low, as there is insufficient iron.
Anemia of chronic disease	Low, as the body holds iron intracellularly with ferritin.	Low. The body produces less transferrin (but more ferritin), presumably to keep iron away from pathogens that require it for their metabolism. This is mainly regulated by increased hepcidin production.	Normal
Pregnancy or use of hormonal contraception, but without iron deficiency	Normal	High. The liver increases the production of transferrin, thus raising TIBC.	Low, as there is excess transferrin with normal serum iron levels.

These examples demonstrate that to properly understand a value for TIBC, one also must know the serum iron, the percent transferrin saturation, and the individual clinical situation. In modern laboratory testings, serum ferritin levels are generally accepted as reliable single indicators of the presence of iron deficiency.

== Usual values ==
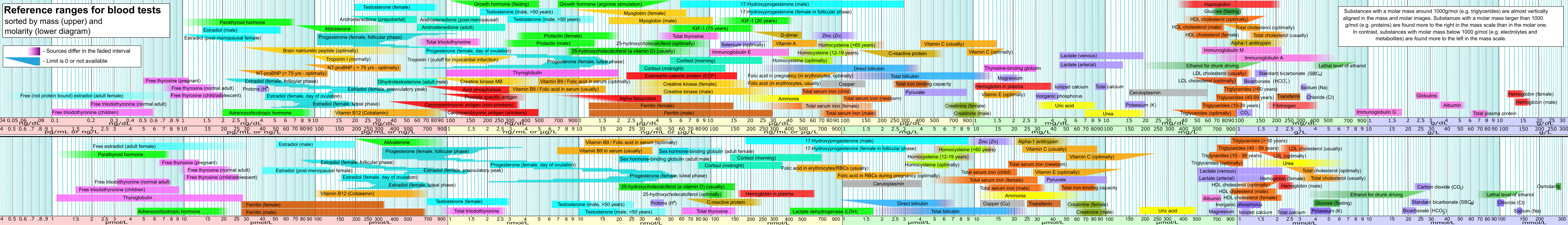
Reference ranges for blood tests, comparing blood content of iron and related compounds (shown in brown and orange) with other constituents.

Laboratories often use different units of measurement and "normal ranges" may vary by population and the laboratory techniques used. Look at the individual laboratory reference values to interpret a specific test (for instance, your own). Example reference ranges are:

- Serum iron: Male 65–177 μg/dL (11.6–31.7 μmol/L); Female 50–170 μg/dL (9.0–30.4 μmol/L)
- TIBC: 250–370 μg/dL (45-66 μmol/L)
- Transferrin saturation: Male 20–50%; Female 15–50%
- Serum ferritin: Male 20-250 μg/L, Female 15-150 μg/L

μg/dL = micrograms per deciliter; μmol/L = micromoles per litre.
