= Transferrin saturation =

Medical lab value of bound serum iron

Transferrin saturation (TS), measured as a percentage, is a medical laboratory value. It is the value of serum iron divided by the total iron-binding capacity of the available transferrin, the main protein that binds iron in the blood, this value tells a clinician how much serum iron is bound. For instance, a value of 15% means that 15% of iron-binding sites of transferrin are being occupied by iron. The three results are usually reported together. A low transferrin saturation is a common indicator of iron deficiency anemia whereas a high transferrin saturation may indicate iron overload or hemochromatosis. Transferrin saturation is also called transferrin saturation index (TSI) or transferrin saturation percentage (TS%)

== Interpretation ==
Studies also reveal that a transferrin saturation (serum iron concentration ÷ total iron binding capacity) over 60 percent in men and over 50 percent in women identified the presence of an abnormality in iron metabolism (hereditary hemochromatosis, heterozygotes and homozygotes) with approximately 95 percent accuracy. This finding helps in the early diagnosis of hereditary hemochromatosis, especially while serum ferritin still remains low. The retained iron in hereditary hemochromatosis is primarily deposited in parenchymal cells, with reticuloendothelial cell accumulation occurring very late in the disease. This is in contrast to transfusional iron overload in which iron deposition occurs first in the reticuloendothelial cells and then in parenchymal cells. This explains why ferritin levels may remain relatively low in hereditary hemochromatosis while transferrin saturation is high.

== Usual values ==
Normal reference ranges are:

- Serum iron: 60–170 μg/dL (10–30 μmol/L)
- Total iron-binding capacity: 240–450 μg/dL
- Transferrin saturation: average 25%. Reference ranges depend on multiple factors like age, sex, race and test devices. Most laboratories define “normal” as max. 30% for female and max. 45% for male persons. Above 50% the risk of toxic non-transferrin bound iron (NTBI) rises exponentially, potentially causing organ damage.

μg/dL = micrograms per deciliter

μmol/L = micromoles per liter

Laboratories often use different units and "normal" may vary by population and the lab techniques used. To help clinicians interpret their patients' results, laboratories are generally also required to report their normal or reference values.

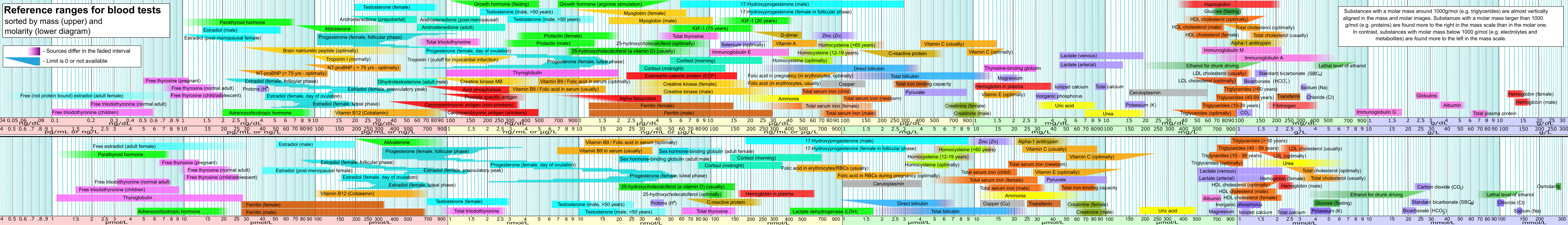
Reference ranges for blood tests, comparing blood content of iron and related compounds (shown in brown and orange) with other constituents.
