= Transferrin =

Mammalian protein found in Homo sapiens

TF
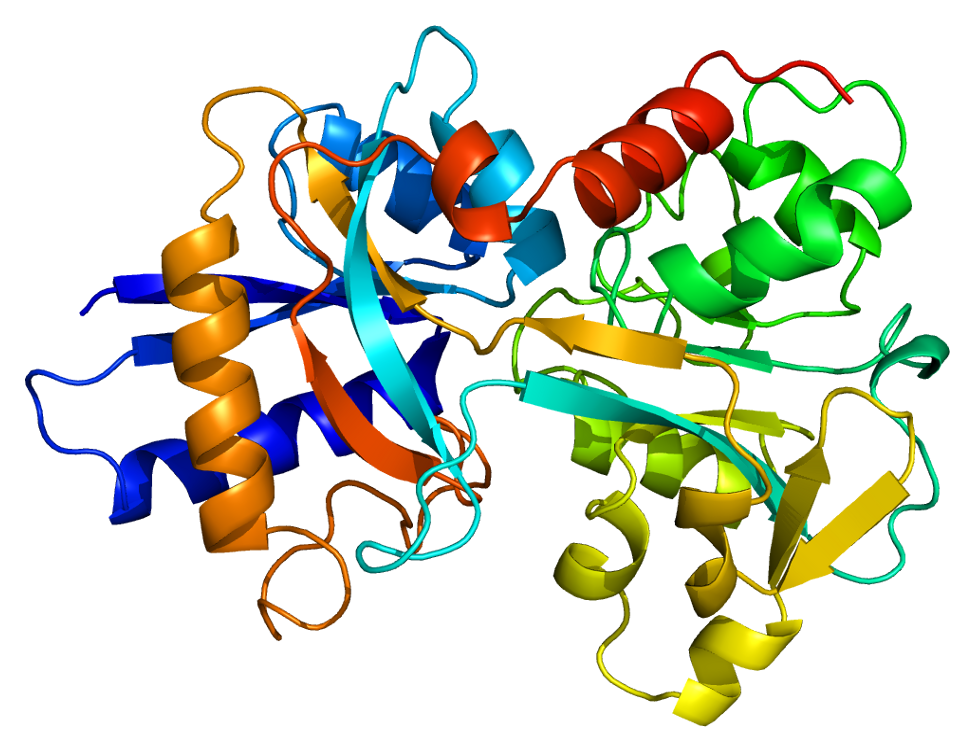

Identifiers
- Aliases: TF, PRO1557, PRO2086, TFQTL1, HEL-S-71p, transferrin
- External IDs: OMIM: 190000; MGI: 98821; GeneCards: TF
Available structures
PDB	Ortholog search: PDBe RCSB
PDB	List of PDB id codes 4X1D, 1A8E, 1A8F, 1B3E, 1BP5, 1BTJ, 1D3K, 1D4N, 1DTG, 1FQE, 1FQF, 1JQF, 1N7W, 1N7X, 1N84, 1OQG, 1OQH, 1RYO, 1SUV, 2HAU, 2HAV, 2O7U, 2O84, 3FGS, 3QYT, 3S9L, 3S9M, 3S9N, 3SKP, 3V83, 3V89, 3V8X, 3VE1, 4H0W, 4X1B, 5DYH

Gene location (Human)
Chr.	Chromosome 3 (human)
Band	3q22.1	Start	133,746,040 bp
Band	3q22.1	End	133,796,641 bp

Gene location (Mouse)
Chr.	Chromosome 9 (mouse)
Band	9 F1|9 55.03 cM	Start	103,081,200 bp
Band	9 F1|9 55.03 cM	End	103,107,643 bp
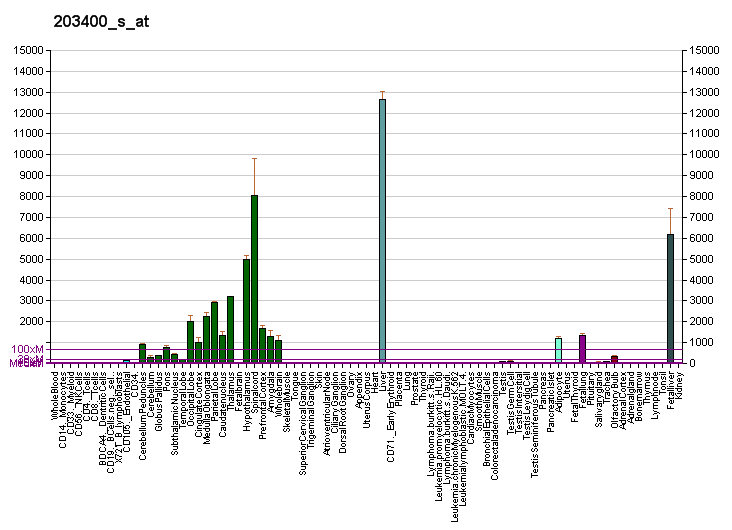

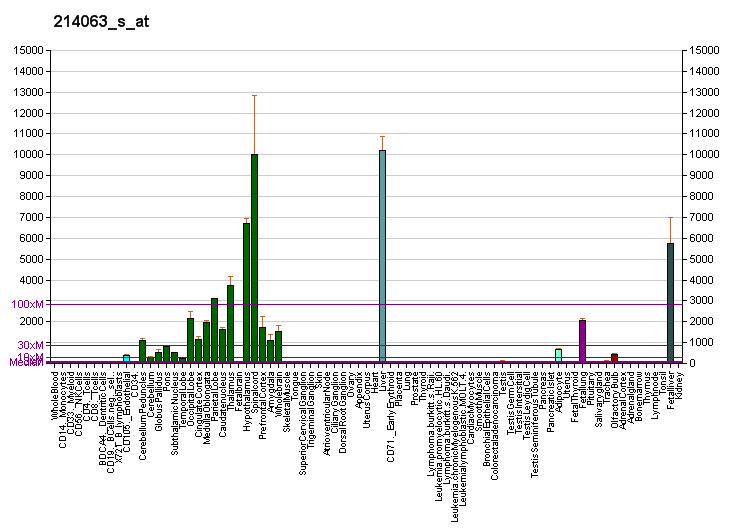
RNA expression pattern
Bgee	Human / Mouse (ortholog); Top expressed in: inferior ganglion of vagus nerve; corpus callosum; superior vestibular nucleus; endothelial cell; pons; middle frontal gyrus; inferior olivary nucleus; C1 segment; ventral tegmental area; optic nerve / Top expressed in: left lobe of liver; retinal pigment epithelium; human fetus; white adipose tissue; fetal liver hematopoietic progenitor cell; transitional epithelium of urinary bladder; utricle; yolk sac; left lung lobe; deep cerebellar nuclei; More reference expression data
BioGPS	More reference expression data
Gene ontology
Molecular function	ferric iron binding; metal ion binding; protein binding; ferric iron transmembrane transporter activity; ferrous iron binding; transferrin receptor binding; iron chaperone activity
Cellular component	recycling endosome; vesicle; HFE-transferrin receptor complex; late endosome; blood microparticle; basal part of cell; endocytic vesicle; extracellular region; cell surface; basal plasma membrane; extrinsic component of external side of plasma membrane; early endosome; apical plasma membrane; perinuclear region of cytoplasm; clathrin-coated pit; secretory granule lumen; endosome membrane; extracellular exosome; extracellular space; clathrin-coated vesicle membrane; cytoplasmic vesicle; endoplasmic reticulum lumen
Biological process	positive regulation of receptor-mediated endocytosis; cellular response to iron ion; regulation of protein stability; transferrin transport; iron ion homeostasis; platelet degranulation; ion transport; retina homeostasis; iron ion transport; cellular iron ion homeostasis; membrane organization; post-translational protein modification; transport; iron ion transmembrane transport; regulation of iron ion transport
Sources:Amigo / QuickGO
Orthologs
Databases	NCBI: entry; OMA: entry
Species	Human	Mouse
Entrez	7018	22041
Ensembl	ENSG00000091513	ENSMUSG00000032554
UniProt	P02787	Q921I1
RefSeq (mRNA)	NM_001063; NM_001354704; NM_001354703	NM_133977
RefSeq (protein)	NP_001054; NP_001341633; NP_001341632	NP_598738
Location (UCSC)	Chr 3: 133.75 – 133.8 Mb	Chr 9: 103.08 – 103.11 Mb
PubMed search
- Wikidata
View/Edit Human	View/Edit Mouse

Transferrin

Identifiers
- Symbol: Transferrin
- Pfam: PF00405
- InterPro: IPR001156
- PROSITE: PDOC00182
- SCOP2: 1lcf / SCOPe / SUPFAM
Available protein structures:
- PDB: IPR001156 PF00405 (ECOD; PDBsum)
- AlphaFold: IPR001156; PF00405

Transferrins are glycoproteins found in vertebrates which bind and consequently mediate the transport of iron (Fe) through blood plasma. They are produced in the liver and contain binding sites for two Fe^{3+} ions. Human transferrin, also called serotransferrin, is encoded by the TF gene and produced as a 76 kDa glycoprotein.

Transferrin glycoproteins bind iron tightly, but reversibly. Although iron bound to transferrin is less than 0.1% (4 mg) of total body iron, it forms the most vital iron pool with the highest rate of turnover (25 mg/24 h). Transferrin has a molecular weight of around 80 kDa and contains two specific high-affinity Fe(III) binding sites. The affinity of transferrin for Fe(III) is extremely high (association constant is 10^{20} M^{−1} at pH 7.4) but decreases progressively with decreasing pH below neutrality. Transferrins are not limited to only binding to iron but also to different metal ions. These glycoproteins are located in various bodily fluids of vertebrates. Some invertebrates have proteins that act like transferrin found in the hemolymph.

When not bound to iron, transferrin is known as "apotransferrin" (see also apoprotein).

== Occurrence and function ==
Transferrins are glycoproteins that are often found in biological fluids of vertebrates. When a transferrin protein loaded with iron encounters a transferrin receptor on the surface of a cell, e.g., erythroid precursors in the bone marrow, it binds to it and is transported into the cell in a vesicle by receptor-mediated endocytosis. The pH of the vesicle is reduced by hydrogen ion pumps (H^{+} ATPases) to about 5.5, causing transferrin to release its iron ions. Iron release rate is dependent on several factors including pH levels, interactions between lobes, temperature, salt, and chelator. The receptor with its ligand bound transferrin is then transported through the endocytic cycle back to the cell surface, ready for another round of iron uptake. Each transferrin molecule has the ability to carry two iron ions in the ferric form (Fe^{3+}).

=== Humans and other mammals ===
The liver is the main site of transferrin synthesis but other tissues and organs, including the brain, also produce transferrin. A major source of transferrin secretion in the brain is the choroid plexus in the ventricular system. The main role of transferrin is to deliver iron from absorption centers in the duodenum and white blood cell macrophages to all tissues. Transferrin plays a key role in areas where erythropoiesis and active cell division occur. The receptor helps maintain iron homeostasis in the cells by controlling iron concentrations.

The gene coding for transferrin in humans is located in chromosome band 3q21.

Medical professionals may check serum transferrin level in iron deficiency and in iron overload disorders such as hemochromatosis.

=== Other species ===
Drosophila melanogaster has three transferrin genes and is highly divergent from all other model clades, Ciona intestinalis one, Danio rerio has three highly divergent from each other, as do Takifugu rubripes and Xenopus tropicalis and Gallus gallus, while Monodelphis domestica has two divergent orthologs, and Mus musculus has two relatively close and one more distant ortholog. Relatedness and orthology/paralogy data are also available for Dictyostelium discoideum, Arabidopsis thaliana, and Pseudomonas aeruginosa.

== Structure ==
In humans, transferrin consists of a polypeptide chain containing 679 amino acids and two carbohydrate chains. The protein is composed of alpha helices and beta sheets that form two domains. The N- and C- terminal sequences are represented by globular lobes and between the two lobes is an iron-binding site.

The amino acids which bind the iron ion to the transferrin are identical for both lobes; two tyrosines, one histidine, and one aspartic acid. For the iron ion to bind, an anion is required, preferably carbonate (CO^{2−}_{3}).

Transferrin also has a transferrin iron-bound receptor; it is a disulfide-linked homodimer. In humans, each monomer consists of 760 amino acids. It enables ligand bonding to the transferrin, as each monomer can bind to one or two atoms of iron. Each monomer consists of three domains: the protease, the helical, and the apical domains. The shape of a transferrin receptor resembles a butterfly based on the intersection of three clearly shaped domains. Two main transferrin receptors found in humans denoted as transferrin receptor 1 (TfR1) and transferrin receptor 2 (TfR2). Although both are similar in structure, TfR1 can only bind specifically to human TF where TfR2 also has the capability to interact with bovine TF.

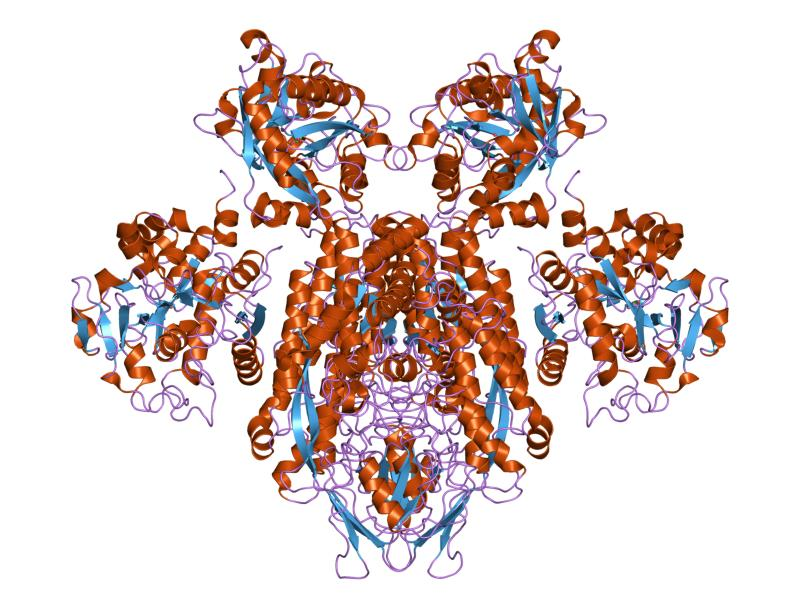
Transferrin bound to its receptor.

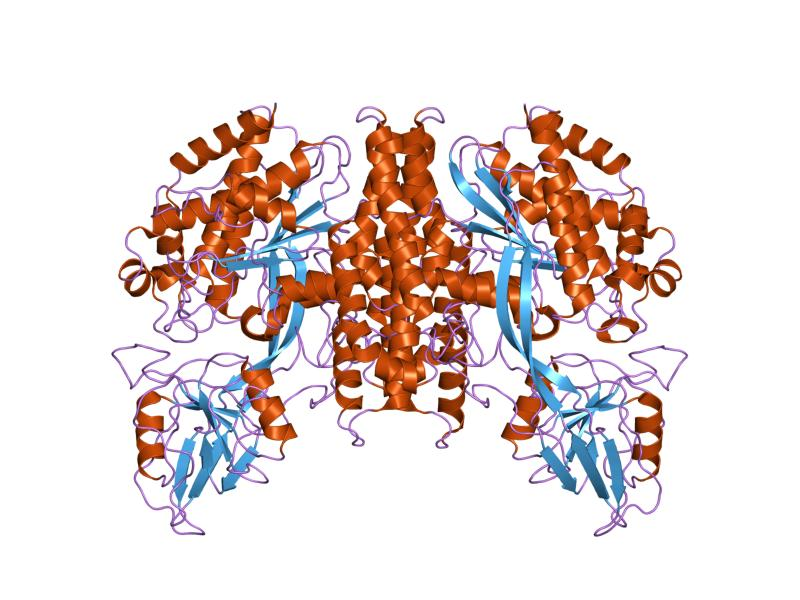
Transferrin receptor complex.

== Immune system ==
Transferrin is also associated with the innate immune system. It is found in the mucosa and binds iron, thus creating an environment low in free iron that impedes bacterial survival in a process called iron withholding. The level of transferrin decreases in inflammation.

== Role in disease ==
An increased plasma transferrin level is often seen in patients with iron deficiency anemia, during pregnancy, and with the use of oral contraceptives, reflecting an increase in transferrin protein expression. When plasma transferrin levels rise, there is a reciprocal decrease in percent transferrin iron saturation, and a corresponding increase in total iron binding capacity in iron deficient states

A decreased plasma transferrin level can occur in iron overload diseases and protein malnutrition. An absence of transferrin results from a rare genetic disorder known as atransferrinemia, a condition characterized by anemia and hemosiderosis in the heart and liver that leads to heart failure and many other complications as well as to H63D syndrome.

Studies reveal that a transferrin saturation (serum iron concentration ÷ total iron binding capacity) over 60 percent in men and over 50 percent in women identified the presence of an abnormality in iron metabolism (hereditary hemochromatosis, heterozygotes and homozygotes) with approximately 95 percent accuracy. This finding helps in the early diagnosis of hereditary hemochromatosis, especially while serum ferritin still remains low. The retained iron in hereditary hemochromatosis is primarily deposited in parenchymal cells, with reticuloendothelial cell accumulation occurring very late in the disease. This is in contrast to transfusional iron overload in which iron deposition occurs first in the reticuloendothelial cells and then in parenchymal cells. This explains why ferritin levels remain relative low in hereditary hemochromatosis, while transferrin saturation is high.

Transferrin and its receptor have been shown to diminish tumour cells when the receptor is used to attract antibodies. Transferrin levels have been shown to be a promising indicator for diagnosing ovarian cancer and cancer-associated functional iron deficiency.

== Transferrin and nanomedicine ==
Many drugs are hindered when providing treatment when crossing the blood-brain barrier yielding poor uptake into areas of the brain. Transferrin glycoproteins are able to bypass the blood-brain barrier via receptor-mediated transport for specific transferrin receptors found in the brain capillary endothelial cells. Due to this functionality, it is theorized that nanoparticles acting as drug carriers bound to transferrin glycoproteins can penetrate the blood-brain barrier allowing these substances to reach the diseased cells in the brain. Advances with transferrin conjugated nanoparticles could lead to non-invasive drug distribution in the brain with potential therapeutic consequences of central nervous system (CNS) targeted diseases (e.g. Alzheimer's or Parkinson's disease).

== Other effects ==
Carbohydrate deficient transferrin increases in the blood with heavy ethanol consumption and can be monitored through laboratory testing.

Transferrin is an acute-phase protein and is seen to decrease in inflammation, cancers, and certain diseases (in contrast to other acute phase proteins, e.g., C-reactive protein, which increase in case of acute inflammation).

== Pathology ==
Atransferrinemia is associated with a deficiency in transferrin.

In nephrotic syndrome, urinary loss of transferrin, along with other serum proteins such as thyroxine-binding globulin, gammaglobulin, and anti-thrombin III, can manifest as iron-resistant microcytic anemia.

== Reference ranges ==
An example reference range for transferrin is 204–360 mg/dL. Laboratory test results should be interpreted using the reference range provided by the laboratory that performed the test.

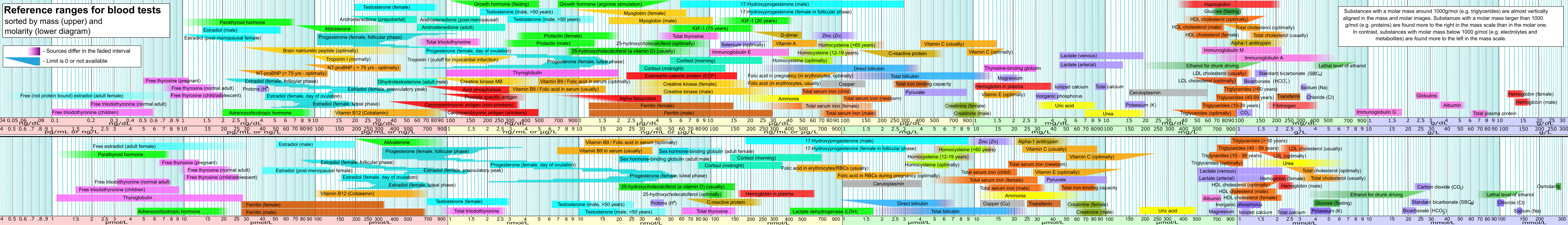
Reference ranges for blood tests, comparing blood content of transferrin and other iron-related compounds (shown in brown and orange) with other constituents

A high transferrin level may indicate an iron deficiency anemia. Levels of serum iron and total iron binding capacity (TIBC) are used in conjunction with transferrin to specify any abnormality. See interpretation of TIBC. Low transferrin likely indicates malnutrition.

== Interactions ==
Transferrin has been shown to interact with insulin-like growth factor 2 and IGFBP3. Transcriptional regulation of transferrin is upregulated by retinoic acid.

== Related proteins ==
Members of the family include blood serotransferrin (or siderophilin, usually simply called transferrin); lactotransferrin (lactoferrin); milk transferrin; egg white ovotransferrin (conalbumin); and membrane-associated melanotransferrin.

== See also ==
- Beta-2 transferrin
- Transferrin receptor
- Total iron-binding capacity
- Transferrin saturation
- Ferritin
- Optiferrin recombinant human transferrin
- Atransferrinemia
- Hypotransferrinemia
- HFE H63D gene mutation
