= Physics of respiration =

- Major structures of the respiratory system involved in physical gas exchange processes

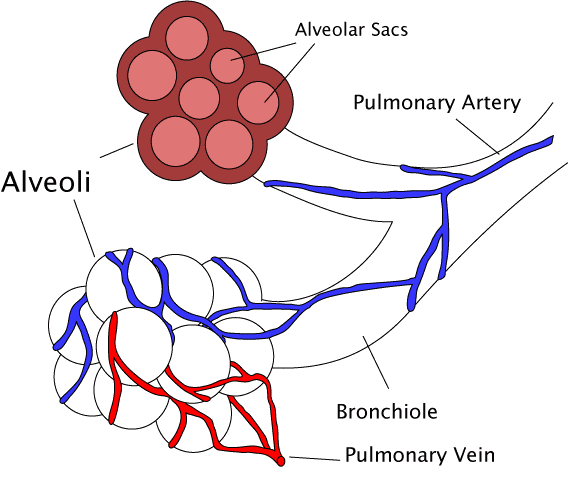
- Alveolar structure showing gas exchange surfaces governed by diffusion laws

Details
- Synonyms: Respiratory physics, Biophysics of breathing
- System: Respiratory system
- Artery: Pulmonary artery
- Vein: Pulmonary vein
- Nerve: Phrenic nerve, Vagus nerve
- Lymph: Bronchopulmonary lymph nodes

The physics of respiration encompasses the physical principles and laws that govern gas exchange and breathing mechanics in living organisms. Respiration is fundamentally a biophysical process governed by classical gas laws, fluid dynamics, thermodynamics, and mechanics.

== Overview ==
The respiratory system functions to exchange oxygen (O_{2}) and carbon dioxide (CO_{2}) between the atmosphere and blood. This exchange depends entirely on pressure gradients, molecular diffusion, and mechanical forces. The physics of respiration can be analyzed through several fundamental domains: gas laws governing partial pressures, mechanics of breathing involving pressure-volume relationships, diffusion kinetics across membranes, fluid dynamics in airways, and surface tension effects in alveoli.

== Gas laws in respiration ==
=== Dalton's law of partial pressures ===
Dalton's law states that in a mixture of non-reacting gases, the total pressure equals the sum of the partial pressures of individual gases:

$$P_{total} = P_1 + P_2 + P_3 + ... + P_n$$

This law explains how each gas in air (nitrogen, oxygen, carbon dioxide, water vapor) contributes to total atmospheric pressure. At sea level, atmospheric pressure is approximately 760 mm Hg, and the partial pressure of oxygen is 160 mm Hg, yielding a fraction of oxygen of 0.21. On inspiration, air is warmed and moisturized to saturation in the human airways. The addition of water vapor decreases the partial pressure of other gasses. The partial pressure of oxygen within the upper airways is called inspired P_{O_{2}} ($P_{IO_2}$) and is calculated:

$$P_{IO_2} = F_{IO_2} \times (P_{atm} - P_{H_2O})$$

where F_{IO_{2}} is the fractional concentration of inspired oxygen (0.21), P_{atm} is atmospheric pressure, and P_{H_{2}O} is the partial pressure of water vapor in the upper airways. This yields a $P_{IO_2}$ of approximately 150 mm Hg.

On inhalation, air passes through the upper airways until eventually reaching the alveoli in the lungs. The alveolar gas equation applies Dalton's law to calculate alveolar oxygen partial pressure:

$$P_AO_2 = P_{IO_2} - \frac{P_ACO_2}{R}$$

where P_{A}O_{2} is the partial pressure of alveolar oxygen, and P_{A}CO_{2} is the partial pressure of alveolar carbon dioxide, and R is the respiratory quotient (typically 0.8).

=== Henry's law ===
Henry's law describes gas solubility in liquids, stating that the amount of dissolved gas is proportional to its partial pressure:

$$C = k_H \times P$$

where C is the concentration of dissolved gas, k_{H} is Henry's constant (solubility coefficient), and P is the partial pressure. Different gases have different solubility coefficients in blood. Carbon dioxide is approximately 20 times more soluble in blood than oxygen, which has important physiological implications for gas transport.

In aerospace medicine, Henry's law underlies the development and treatment of decompression illness. Increases in altitude correspond to a decrease in the partial pressure of nitrogen, and corresponding decrease in dissolved nitrogen in the blood. If the nitrogen rapidly comes out of solution then it forms bubbles which can block off small capillaries and damage tissues. Cabin pressurization helps prevent this, but is not usually available in helicopters, requiring them to fly at lower altitudes safe for human physiology. Breathing gases used in high-altitude aircraft usually have a higher oxygen concentration (and therefore lower nitrogen concentration) in order to help remove nitrogen from the blood. This is also the reasoning for the usage of oxygen masks on airlines during sudden cabin depressurization. Although the partial pressure of oxygen also decreases with increases in elevation, since the majority of oxygen in the blood is bound to hemoglobin, it does not bubble out like nitrogen does.

=== Boyle's law ===
Boyle's law states that for a fixed amount of gas at constant temperature, pressure and volume are inversely related:

$$P_1V_1 = P_2V_2$$

The lungs follow Boyle's law except near their maximum or minimum volumes when their compliance is low. During inhalation, the thoracic cavity expands, increasing lung volume and decreasing intrapulmonary pressure below atmospheric pressure, causing air to flow inward. During exhalation, the thoracic cavity decreases in volume, increasing pressure and forcing air outward.

The lungs exist within a negative pressure cavity called the pleural space. Under normal conditions the lungs expand to fill the pleural space. The pleural space directly expands or contracts with the thoracic cavity, causing the lungs to expand or contract with the thoracic cavity as well. However, if the pleural space accumulates blood or air then there is an increase in pressure within it, requiring a greater expansion of the thoracic cavity to inflate the lungs.

As a scuba diver descends, the pressure in their lungs increases, and in accordance to Boyle's law the volume within their lungs decreases. On ascent the inverse is true, and if a scuba diver doesn't exhale the increase in volume then they risk the overexpansion and rupture of their alveoli.

== Mechanics of Breathing ==
=== Pressure-Volume Relationships ===
The mechanics of breathing involve coordinated changes in pressure and volume within the respiratory system. The key pressures involved are:

- Atmospheric pressure (P_{atm}): pressure of ambient air (760 mmHg at sea level)
- Alveolar pressure (P_{alv}): pressure within the alveoli
- Intrapleural pressure (P_{pl}): pressure in the pleural space
- Transpulmonary pressure (P_{tp}): difference between alveolar and intrapleural pressure

The transpulmonary pressure represents the distending pressure across the lung:

$$P_{tp} = P_{alv} - P_{pl}$$

This pressure determines lung volume and is critical for understanding lung mechanics. The relationship between transpulmonary pressure and lung volume defines pulmonary compliance.

=== Compliance and elastance ===
Compliance (C) is defined as the change in volume per unit change in pressure:

$$C = \frac{\Delta V}{\Delta P}$$

Normal lung compliance is approximately 200 mL/cm H_{2}O. Compliance is low when the lungs are nearly fully expanded or collapsed. As newborns are born with no air in their lungs, their initial lung compliance is low, requiring greater pressure to take their first breaths and inflate their lungs.

Diseases such as pulmonary fibrosis decrease compliance (stiff lungs), while emphysema increases compliance (loss of elastic recoil).

Elastance (E) is the reciprocal of compliance:

$$E = \frac{1}{C} = \frac{\Delta P}{\Delta V}$$

The lung and chest wall each have their own compliance values, and the total respiratory system compliance is determined by:

$$\frac{1}{C_{total}} = \frac{1}{C_{lung}} + \frac{1}{C_{chest wall}}$$

=== Work of breathing ===
The work of breathing represents the energy required to overcome elastic and resistive forces during ventilation. It can be calculated as:

$$W = \int P \, dV$$

This work has three components:

1. Elastic work: energy to overcome elastic recoil of lungs and chest wall
2. Resistive work: energy to overcome airway and tissue resistance
3. Inertial work: energy to accelerate gases and tissues (usually negligible)

== Gas diffusion ==
=== Fick's laws of diffusion ===
Gas exchange across the alveolar-capillary membrane is governed by Fick's first law of diffusion:

$$V_{gas} = \frac{A \times D \times (P_1 - P_2)}{T}$$

where:

- V_{gas} is the rate of gas transfer
- A is the surface area available for diffusion (~70 m^{2} in human lungs)
- D is the diffusion coefficient (depends on gas properties and tissue)
- P_{1} - P_{2} is the partial pressure difference across the membrane
- T is the thickness of the membrane (~0.5 μm)

This equation can be simplified to:

$$V_{gas} = D_L \times (P_1 - P_2)$$

where D_{L} is the diffusing capacity of the lung, which incorporates surface area, membrane thickness, and diffusion properties.

=== Diffusion coefficients ===
The diffusion coefficient depends on:

1. Molecular weight: inversely proportional to the square root of molecular weight
2. Solubility: directly proportional to gas solubility in tissue
3. Temperature: increases with temperature

Carbon dioxide diffuses approximately 20 times faster than oxygen across the alveolar-capillary membrane due to its much higher solubility, despite its slightly larger molecular weight.

=== Diffusion limitation versus perfusion limitation ===
Gas transfer can be limited by either diffusion or perfusion:

- Diffusion-limited: Transfer rate limited by membrane properties (occurs with CO, O_{2} during exercise or disease)
- Perfusion-limited: Transfer rate limited by blood flow (occurs with N_{2}O, O_{2} at rest)

== Airway resistance and fluid dynamics ==
=== Poiseuille's law ===
For laminar flow through cylindrical tubes, the Hagen-Poiseuille equation describes the relationship between flow rate and pressure:

$$Q = \frac{\pi r^4 \Delta P}{8 \mu L}$$

where:

- Q is flow rate
- r is radius of the airway
- ΔP is pressure difference
- μ is viscosity of the gas
- L is length of the airway

This equation demonstrates that flow is proportional to the fourth power of the radius, making airway radius the most critical determinant of resistance.

Airway resistance (R) is defined as:

$$R = \frac{\Delta P}{Q}$$

From Poiseuille's law:

$$R = \frac{8 \mu L}{\pi r^4}$$

Normal total airway resistance is approximately 1-2 cmH_{2}O/L/s. Disease states such as asthma and chronic obstructive pulmonary disease significantly increase airway resistance.

=== Laminar and turbulent flow ===
Flow patterns in airways depend on the Reynolds number (Re):

$$Re = \frac{\rho v d}{\mu}$$

where:

- ρ is gas density
- v is velocity
- d is diameter
- μ is viscosity
- Laminar flow (Re < 2000): smooth, organized flow following Poiseuille's law
- Turbulent flow (Re > 4000): chaotic, disorganized flow with higher resistance
- Transitional flow (2000 < Re < 4000): mixture of laminar and turbulent

In turbulent flow, resistance increases proportionally to the square of flow rate, rather than being independent of flow as in laminar conditions.

Nitrogen and helium have comparable viscosity, so heliox (mixture of helium and oxygen) has comparable viscosity to air. However, the density is nearly 6 times lower, decreasing turbulence on inhalation (more emphasized in the narrower passages near the end of the lungs). The decrease in turbulent flow causes an increase in laminar flow, and results in an increase in flow rates up to 50%.

== Surface tension and the Laplace law ==
=== Young-Laplace equation ===
Surface tension at the air-liquid interface in alveoli creates a pressure according to the Young-Laplace equation:

$$P = \frac{2T}{r}$$

where:

- P is pressure inside the alveolus
- T is surface tension
- r is radius of the alveolus

This equation predicts that smaller alveoli would have higher pressures and would tend to collapse into larger alveoli (a phenomenon that would lead to complete lung collapse). This is prevented by pulmonary surfactant.

=== Pulmonary surfactant ===
Pulmonary surfactant is a complex mixture of lipids and proteins secreted by type II pneumocytes. It reduces surface tension from approximately 70 dyn/cm (pure water) to as low as 5-10 dyn/cm.

Surfactant has two critical physical properties:

1. Reduces surface tension: Decreases the work of breathing
2. Provides stability: Surface tension varies with area, decreasing more in smaller alveoli, which prevents collapse

Without surfactant, the pressure required to inflate the lungs would be prohibitively high, and alveolar instability would result in atelectasis. Neonatal respiratory distress syndrome occurs when premature infants lack adequate surfactant production.

== Ventilation-perfusion relationships ==
=== V/Q ratio ===
The ventilation/perfusion ratio (V̇/Q̇) describes the relationship between alveolar ventilation and pulmonary blood flow. Ideal gas exchange requires matching of ventilation to perfusion.

For the whole lung:

- Normal alveolar ventilation (V̇_{A}) ≈ 4-5 L/min
- Normal cardiac output (Q̇) ≈ 5 L/min
- Normal V̇/Q̇ ratio ≈ 0.8-1.0

Different V̇/Q̇ ratios produce different gas exchange patterns:

- V̇/Q̇ = 0 (shunt): perfusion without ventilation → blood remains unoxygenated
- V̇/Q̇ = ∞ (dead space): ventilation without perfusion → no gas exchange
- V̇/Q̇ = 1 (ideal): optimal matching of ventilation and perfusion

=== Regional differences ===
Due to gravity, both ventilation and perfusion are greater at the lung bases than the apices when upright. However, perfusion increases more than ventilation from apex to base, creating a gradient of V̇/Q̇ ratios:

- Apex: V̇/Q̇ ≈ 3.0 (high V̇/Q̇)
- Base: V̇/Q̇ ≈ 0.6 (low V̇/Q̇)

This regional variation is explained by the hydrostatic pressure gradient in pulmonary blood flow and the mechanical properties of the lung.

== Gas transport in blood ==
=== Oxygen transport ===
Oxygen is transported in blood in two forms:

1. Dissolved in plasma (~2%): Governed by Henry's law
2. Bound to hemoglobin (~98%): Governed by the oxygen-hemoglobin dissociation curve

The oxygen content of blood is:

$$C_{O_2} = (1.34 \times [Hb] \times S_{O_2}) + (0.003 \times P_{O_2})$$

where:

- 1.34 mL O_{2}/g Hb is the oxygen-carrying capacity
- [Hb] is hemoglobin concentration (g/dL)
- SO_{2} is hemoglobin saturation (%)
- 0.003 mL O_{2}/dL/mmHg is the solubility coefficient
- P_{O_{2}} is partial pressure of oxygen (mmHg)

=== Carbon dioxide transport ===
Carbon dioxide is transported in three forms:

1. Dissolved in plasma (~7%): Governed by Henry's law
2. Bicarbonate (~70%): CO_{2} and HCO^{−}_{3} are interconverted in a reaction catalyzed by carbonic anhydrase
3. Carbamino compounds (~23%): Bound to hemoglobin and plasma proteins

The Haldane effect describes how deoxygenated hemoglobin can carry more CO_{2} than oxygenated hemoglobin, facilitating CO_{2} transport from tissues to lungs.

== Control of breathing ==
=== Chemical control ===
Respiratory control involves chemoreceptors that sense changes in blood gases and pH:

- Central chemoreceptors: Located in the medulla, respond primarily to pH changes in cerebrospinal fluid (reflecting CO_{2} levels)
- Peripheral chemoreceptors: Located in carotid and aortic bodies, respond to O_{2}, CO_{2}, and pH

The ventilatory response to CO_{2} is nearly linear:

$$V_E = S \times (P_{CO_2} - B)$$

where V_{E} is minute ventilation, S is the slope (sensitivity), P_{CO_{2}} is arterial CO_{2}, and B is the intercept.

=== Mechanical control ===
Mechanoreceptors in the lungs and airways provide feedback:

- Stretch receptors: Detect lung inflation (Hering-Breuer reflex)
- Irritant receptors: Respond to noxious stimuli
- J-receptors: Respond to pulmonary congestion

== Clinical applications ==
=== Respiratory mechanics in disease ===
Understanding the physics of respiration is essential for managing respiratory diseases:

- Obstructive lung disease (asthma, COPD): Increased airway resistance due to narrowed airways (Poiseuille's law)
- Restrictive lung disease (pulmonary fibrosis): Decreased lung compliance due to stiff lungs
- Acute respiratory distress syndrome (ARDS): Decreased compliance and impaired gas exchange due to alveolar damage and surfactant dysfunction

=== Mechanical ventilation ===
Mechanical ventilation applies physical principles to support gas exchange:

The equation of motion for the respiratory system describes the relationship between applied pressure and resulting volume:

$$P = E \times V + R \times \dot{V} + P_0$$

where:

- P is applied pressure
- E is elastance
- V is volume
- R is resistance
- V̇ is flow rate
- P_{0} is baseline pressure

This equation guides ventilator settings and monitoring.

=== Altitude physiology ===
At high altitude, atmospheric pressure decreases, reducing inspired P_{O_{2}}:

$$P_{IO_2} = F_{IO_2} \times (P_{barometric} - P_{H_2O})$$

At the summit of Mount Everest (8848 m), barometric pressure is approximately 253 mmHg, resulting in an inspired P_{O_{2}} of only ~43 mmHg, barely sufficient to sustain life.

== Historical development ==
The understanding of respiratory physics developed through several key discoveries:

- 1660s: Robert Boyle formulated Boyle's law
- 1801: John Dalton proposed Dalton's law of partial pressures
- 1803: William Henry described Henry's law of gas solubility
- 1840s: Jean Poiseuille studied fluid flow in tubes
- 1906: August Krogh studied gas diffusion in lungs
- 1920s: Discovery of pulmonary surfactant
- 1940s-1960s: Development of modern respiratory physiology concepts

== See also ==
- Respiratory physiology
- Pulmonary function testing
- Gas exchange
- Spirometry
- Alveolar gas equation
- Oxygen-hemoglobin dissociation curve
- Ventilator-associated lung injury
- Diving physics
- Aviation medicine
