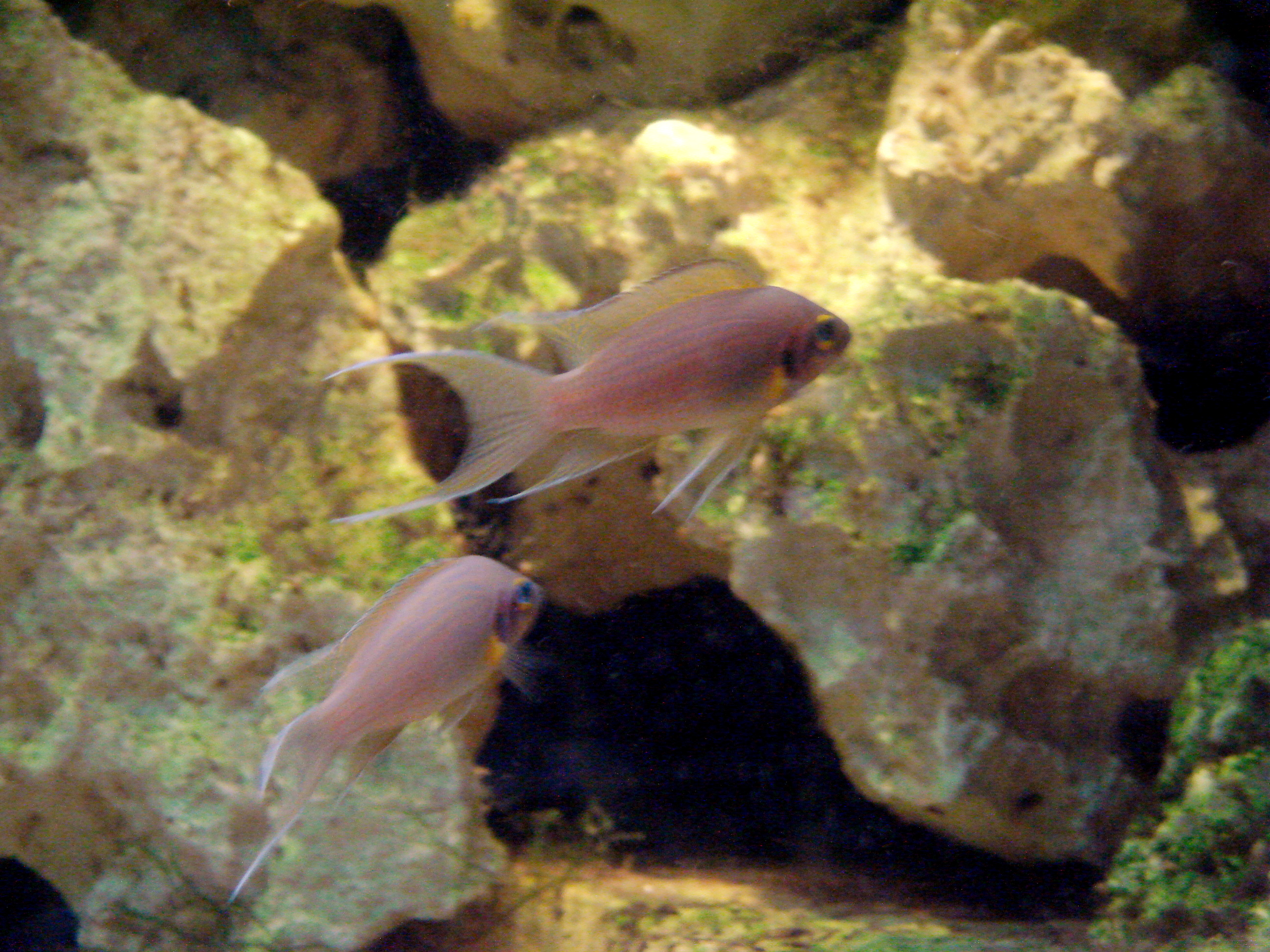

Conservation status
- Least Concern (IUCN 3.1)

Scientific classification
- Kingdom: Animalia
- Phylum: Chordata
- Class: Actinopterygii
- Division: Teleostei
- Order: Cichliformes
- Family: Cichlidae
- Genus: Neolamprologus
- Species: N. pulcher

Binomial name
- Neolamprologus pulcher (Trewavas & Poll, 1952)

Synonyms
- Lamprologus pulcher Trewavas & Poll, 1952

= Neolamprologus pulcher =

Species of fish

Neolamprologus pulcher is a species of cichlid endemic to Lake Tanganyika. The common names for N. pulcher include daffodil cichlid, fairy cichlid, princess of Zambia and lyretail cichlid. This species can reach a length of 10 centimetres (3.9 in) TL. It can also be found in the aquarium trade.

== Taxonomy and phylogeny ==
Previously, it was believed that N. pulcher and N. brichardi were two distinct species. Now they are considered the same species, the only difference being that Neolamprologus brichardi has a black stripe running from its eye to its gill cover and a yellow spot just above it, both of which are absent in N. pulcher. Because Neolamprologus pulcher is the older of the two scientific names, the rules of scientific nomenclature would make this the correct name for the species. The daffodil cichlid, when it was still known as N. brichardi, was named after Pierre Brichard, a Belgian who set up a collection station, for the export of Tanganyikan cichlids in 1971, named "Fishes of Burundi."

== Distribution and habitat ==
Daffodil cichlids are endemic to Lake Tanganyika, Africa and are widespread in the southern part of the lake. They are found along the rocky coastlines of the countries of Burundi, the Democratic Republic of the Congo, Tanzania, and Zambia. There are a number of different geographical varieties. The variety known as the "daffodil" is very popular and is found along the steep rocky slopes of Kantalamba and Kambwinba.

Like other Lamprologini cichlids, daffodil cichlids are highly variable and are found in all kinds of habitats. They are found both at the surface and in very deep waters, but all species are substrate spawners. They have a body that can be somewhat elongated to very elongated. Their colors tend to be brown, yellow, blue, black or a combination of all four. Black is usually a striping, either vertical or horizontal. Like other genera in the tribe, N. pulcher will readily mate with females of other Lamprologini.

Daffodil cichlids inhabit rocky coastlines and swim in large schools that often consist of hundreds of fish. When breeding, however, they will form monogamous pairs and spawn in caves. They are found in waters at depths of 32 feet (10 m) or deeper. They feed on swarms of plankton drifting in the lake water along with microorganisms such as small crustaceans and invertebrates.

== Description ==
Daffodil cichlids are graceful fish with bodies that are elongated with a continuous dorsal fin. The tail fin is lyre-shaped and they develop long flowing filaments on all unpaired fins. They usually reach up to about 4–5 inches (10–13 cm) in length, but can sometimes get a bit bigger in the aquarium reaching up to 6 inches (15 cm). They can live 8 – 10 years with proper care.

These fish have a light-colored tan body washed with hints of yellow and bluish-purple spots. The yellow is stronger along the upper portion of the body and onto the dorsal fin, and around the base of the pectoral fin. There are two vertical crescent-shaped bars just behind the eye highlighted with a bit of blue. The dorsal fin is lyre-shaped and they develop long flowing filaments on all unpaired fins. The fins are tipped with an icy blue. They have brilliant blue eyes.

== Behavior ==
=== Feeding ===
Daffodil cichlids are omnivorous and feed on swarms of plankton in the water column as well as small crustaceans and invertebrates.

=== Cooperative breeding ===
The daffodil cichlid inhabits permanent social groups composed of one breeding pair and helpers of both sexes. Absolute breeding success (assessed by a combined measure of clutch size and egg survival probability) has been shown to be higher for breeding pairs with helpers compared to those without helpers. Egg size tends to decrease as the number of helpers within groups increases, which suggests that the presence of helpers enables breeder females to strategically reduce their investment per egg in a manner that maximizes breeder fitness.

When parents and helpers care for offspring, the protection may reduce the predation risk to offspring, which may allow mothers to invest less per single offspring. Daffodil cichlid helpers protect the group offspring and reduce the offspring's mortality rate. Therefore, dominant females are expected to reduce their investment per egg when more helpers are present. Experiments show that females do indeed reduce egg size with increasing number of helpers but not when perceived neighbor density is high.

==== Kin recognition ====
In cooperatively breeding groups that have a mix of related and unrelated individuals, being able to identify and differentially cooperate with relatives can bring indirect fitness (biology) benefits to helpers. When given a choice between associating with unfamiliar kin or unfamiliar non-kin, juvenile daffodil cichlids spend a significantly longer time associating with kin. Relatedness, rather than familiarity, is more important in the association preferences of the daffodil cichlid, which is advantageous because not all familiar individuals within a cooperatively breeding group are relatives. Having the ability to recognize kin from non-kin brings fitness advantages through kin selection and inbreeding avoidance.

Kin selection can explain the evolution of cooperative breeding, and the distribution of relatives within a population may influence the benefits of cooperative behavior. Females are more likely to inherit the breeding position of their mother or sister in larger groups. Helper to breeder relatedness decreases steeply with increasing helper age, particularly for breeding males. Helper to helper relatedness is age-associative and also declines with age.

=== Social status ===
Since daffodil cichlids are a species that uses cooperative breeding, this means that each individual is ranked in terms of social status. Breeders have a higher social rank than non-breeders. Social status has significant effects on daffodil cichlid behavior.

==== Physiological differences ====
Within a group of breeding and helper cichlids, there exists a dominance hierarchy among every fish in the group. The breeder males and females are dominant individuals who have offspring, while the helper cichlids are subordinate. Dominance is typically determined by size. The effect of social position was investigated on growth rates and other physical conditions. In the absence of breeders, dominant individuals had higher liver glycogen levels and grew the most. Dominant fish in groups of breeders and helpers had significantly higher plasma cortisol concentrations when paired with subordinates. These results suggest that dominant individuals experience higher cortisol levels as well as higher growth rates since higher cortisol levels in the blood indicate that an individual either has less stress or better internal control when stressed. These increased levels of cortisol possibly correlate with size determining rank within the dominance hierarchy.

==== Competition for mates ====
Mature males may compete for fertilization opportunities with females due to the existence of a dominance hierarchy in competitive breeders. Studies have suggested that socially subordinate helper males sneak fertilizations from dominant breeding males. If sneaking does happen, then sperm competition will select for increased reproductive investment by subordinate sneaking males, relative to those of dominant males. This reproductive investment exists in daffodil cichlids in the form of reproductive suppression. Breeders have considerably larger testes than helpers, as well as faster- and longer-swimming sperm and a higher percentage of motile sperm compared to helpers. The sperm of large helpers are characteristically similar to those of breeders, but helpers have smaller testes. The small size of the helpers' testes, coupled with the physiological equivalence of their sperm compared to breeder sperm, imply that the helpers are reproductively suppressed.

==== Multiple paternity ====
Mixed parentage is not too uncommon in the daffodil cichlid. Genetic data collected in groups of daffodil cichlids from Lake Tanganyika revealed mixed parentage in 80% of the examined groups. A case of shared maternity was detected when a subordinate female bred alongside the dominant female in a social group. This was not found to be true for the males, though. Extra-pair paternity was assigned to other dominant males who held their own social groups, but no subordinate males were found to have fathered any young in any of the examined groups.

The degree of multiple paternity in a population of daffodil cichlids is important because sneaking fertilization often results in multiple paternity. The dominant male usually sires all offspring, but not always. When twelve different broods were looked at, it was found that 44.2% of the young were not fathered by the dominant male, and multiple paternity was found in 5 of 12 broods (41.7%), with 8 of 35 young (22.9%) being sired by males other than the territory owning breeder males. This is an exceptionally high rate of extra-pair paternity among cooperative breeding vertebrates, which suggests that male helpers may have produced these young before being expelled from the territory in response to their reproductive parasitism.

==== Liver investment ====
Social status and sex also influence how much daffodil cichlids invest in their livers. Males and females (controlling for body size) have similar liver investment, and subordinates of both sexes have relatively larger livers compared with dominants. Social status results in liver size disparity because it is hypothesized that liver mass reflects status-dependent differences in energy expenditure, but not energy storage or energy acquisition. Dominants perform more energetically costly behaviors (e.g. social policing and care) compared with subordinates, supporting the notion that energy expenditure drives liver investment. Dominants in large groups with many subordinates to monitor and dominants that own multiple territories with a large area to patrol tend to have smaller livers. Subordinates do not appear to use the liver as a strategic energy storage organ. Although subordinates feed more frequently than dominants, a negative correlation is found between feeding rates and liver size. This provides evidence that liver investment patterns are linked to status-driven differences in energy expenditure but not energy intake or storage.

==== Flexibility in dominance hierarchy ====
The social hierarchy is not rigid, as helpers can also become breeders. The most common way for the change is via dispersion into other groups. When helpers disperse by moving into other groups, they can increase their status by becoming a breeder or by moving up in the dominance hierarchy.

In addition to dispersing to join a new group, subordinates may also gain dominant breeding status by inheriting the top position of their current group. Inheritance happens whenever the dominant individual dies or leaves the group. The pathway to breeder status varies between males and females as a result of sex differences in the costs of dispersal and inbreeding. In one study, 71% of male vacancies were filled by joiners. Joiners are incoming fish that are not originally part of the group. However, only 15% of female vacancies were filled. Helpers increase their frequency of cooperative behavior following the removal of a female breeder but not after the removal of a male breeder. This suggests that female breeder vacancies are typically filled by subordinate helpers who inherit from within the group, and male breeder vacancies are commonly filled by joining individuals, who are either existing breeders or helpers from other groups.

=== Physiological consequences of behavior ===
In most vertebrates, aggression and dominance are tightly linked to testosterone. Fish, however, do not only have testosterone but also 11-ketotestosterone, another androgen that influences aggression and dominance. Sex differences in androgens have been investigated and show that newly dominant females have higher plasma levels of testosterone than newly subordinate females, but both types of females have similar 11-ketotestosterone levels. Newly dominant males have higher plasma levels of 11-ketotestosterone than newly subordinate males, but both types of males have similar testosterone levels. The ratio of 11-ketotestosterone to testosterone, which demonstrates the physiological importance of testosterone conversion to 11-ketotestosterone, has been shown to be positively correlated with submissive behavior in female winners and weakly positively correlated with aggressive behavior in male winners. Different androgens play equivalent roles in female versus male dominance establishment, and relative levels of 11-ketotestosterone and testosterone are implicated in female dominance behavior and perhaps the behavior of both sexes.

When metabolic rates for daffodil cichlids were measured using a respirometer, it was found that pair males invested their energy expenditure almost exclusively in intrafamily agonistic behavior, while pair females shared the investment in territory maintenance and direct brood care. There is high energy expenditure for submissive behavior in daffodil cichlids, which might be an indicator of submissive behavior being a reliable signal among cichlids. The considerable energy expenditure involved in territory defense suggests that these costs, in addition to risk, are probably taken into account when doing cost-benefit analyses.

Usually, dominant individuals within group-living species are frequently aggressive towards subordinates, and that aggression can lead to chronic stress, higher glucocorticoid levels, and decreased fitness for subordinates. However, in cooperatively breeding species like the daffodil cichlid, the dominant individuals exhibit higher levels of glucocorticoids, which may be a consequence of the demands of maintaining high social rank and suppressing the reproduction of subordinate group members.

=== Grouping ===
The group size of daffodil cichlid helpers is highly variable and typically ranges from one to fourteen individuals, with larger groups living in larger territories. Additionally, group size is more strongly correlated with territory quality than is breeder size.

Group size positively influences the survival of group members. Group size correlates positively between years; in one study, 34% of the groups became extinct within one year, but none of the large groups became extinct. Large groups are more likely to contain small-sized helpers the subsequent year after breeding, which is a cumulative measure of the previous months' reproductive success and may explain why large groups do not become extinct.

Breeders living in a large group also benefit because individuals feed more often, have lower workloads, and enjoy greater reproductive success. Helpers in larger groups also feed more frequently but do not have lower workloads. Large groups are also more likely to contain a breeding male and female a year after the first check. The sizes of the breeder male, breeder female, and the largest helper within a group do not influence the parameters of the long-term field study, and also do not correlate with the sizes of these categories of fish after one year. This suggests that group size is the critical variable determining the success of the individuals in the group, rather than body size or fighting ability of group members.

=== Territory defense ===
Daffodil cichlids are a very territorial species. They will try to drive out any perceived intruders that wander into their territory, whether it be a conspecific or a heterospecific.

==== Individual recognition ====
Some territorial species have been shown to react more aggressively toward unfamiliar conspecifics (members of the same species) than established neighbors, a behavior referred to as the "dear enemy" phenomenon. Laboratory experiments were conducted to determine whether male daffodil cichlids can discriminate between size-matched familiar and unfamiliar male neighbors and whether they respond more aggressively toward unfamiliar males. The results showed that males spent significantly more time near the territorial boundary that they shared with unfamiliar neighbors and directed significantly more aggressive behavior toward these individuals.

==== Effect of hormones ====
The defense behavior of daffodil cichlids has been shown to be linked to androgens, specifically the defense of their young. Dominant female breeders perform the most care and also display the highest levels of plasma testosterone compared to other individuals within the social group. Dominant male breeders provide a similar amount of care as the subordinate helpers, but breeding males also have the highest levels of 11-ketotestosterone, an important fish androgen. Breeders have higher levels of both androgens compared to helpers, but no matter what the sex or status of the fish, there is a weak but significant positive correlation between testosterone levels and the frequency of care. Androgens may promote the defense of young, which contradicts the commonly reported trade-off between androgen levels and degree of parental care (androgen levels and degree of parental care are usually negatively correlated).

==== Mating system ====
Male daffodil cichlids are facultatively polygynous. Polygyny is regarded as a beneficial mating strategy for males, whereas females often suffer a reduction in pair male contributions. Some males hold only one territory with one breeding female while other males hold multiple territories, each one with its own breeding female. Polygynous males are larger in size, body-scraped less (they suffered less from ectoparasites), have larger testes (when controlled for body mass), and have higher circulating levels of 11-ketotestosterone than monogamous males.

Paradoxically, monogamous males occupy higher-quality territories with more shelter and fewer predators. Monogamous males also provide more parental care than polygynous males, but the number and survival of young do not vary according to male mating behavior. Females have a trade-off between male genetic quality and resources. Males holding only one territory may provide their mates with significant assets but may not be able to outcompete neighbors for additional breeding positions because of their smaller body size and possibly higher parasite load. The lack of differences between monogamous and polygynous groups in terms of offspring survival, a measure of reproductive success, suggests that there may be few, if any, fitness consequences of polygynous pairing for females.

== In the aquarium ==
Daffodil cichlids cannot handle large water changes very well unless the new water chemistry closely matches the water they are in. This inability to tolerate large water changes is due to Lake Tanganyika being very deep and the water tends to stay stable. There should be normal water changes of only 10% to 20% a week, or more frequent small changes depending on the nitrite/ammonia levels and stocking numbers.

The daffodil cichlid is very active and will swim in all areas of the aquarium. A minimum of 15 gallons is recommended for daffodil cichlids living in a tank with no other species of fish, with 20 or 35 US gallons (76 or 132 L) being better. A larger tank of 50 US gallons (190 L) or more would be required if mixing with other species. These fish need good water movement along with very strong and efficient filtration. Lake Tanganyika is a very oxygen-rich lake so bubblers need to be going day and night, even if there are plants, to simulate their natural environment to full effect. Nitrates levels should be no more than 25 ppm; daffodil cichlids also can't tolerate a pH less than 7.
