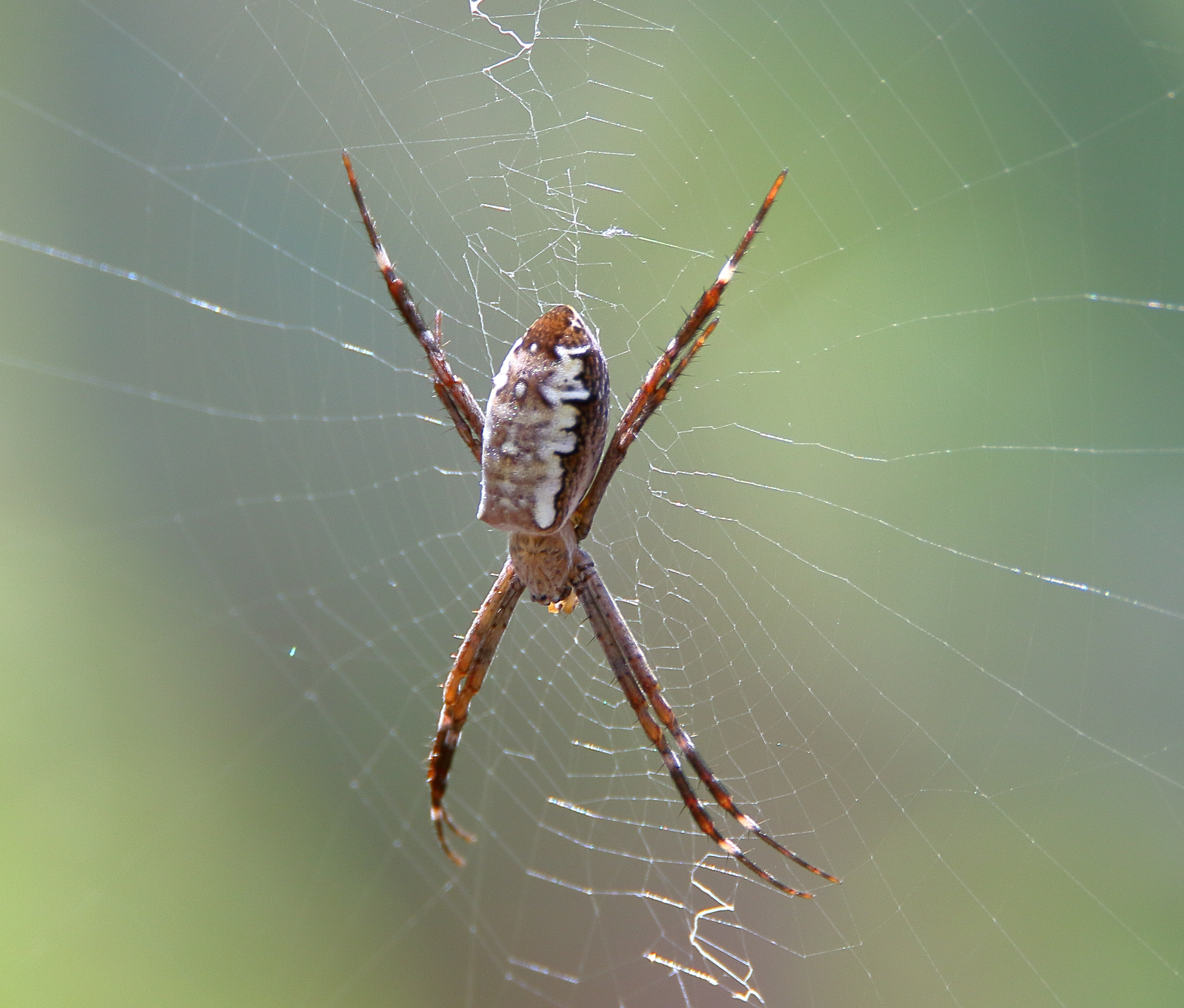
- Argiope radon female dorsal view, Litchfield National Park
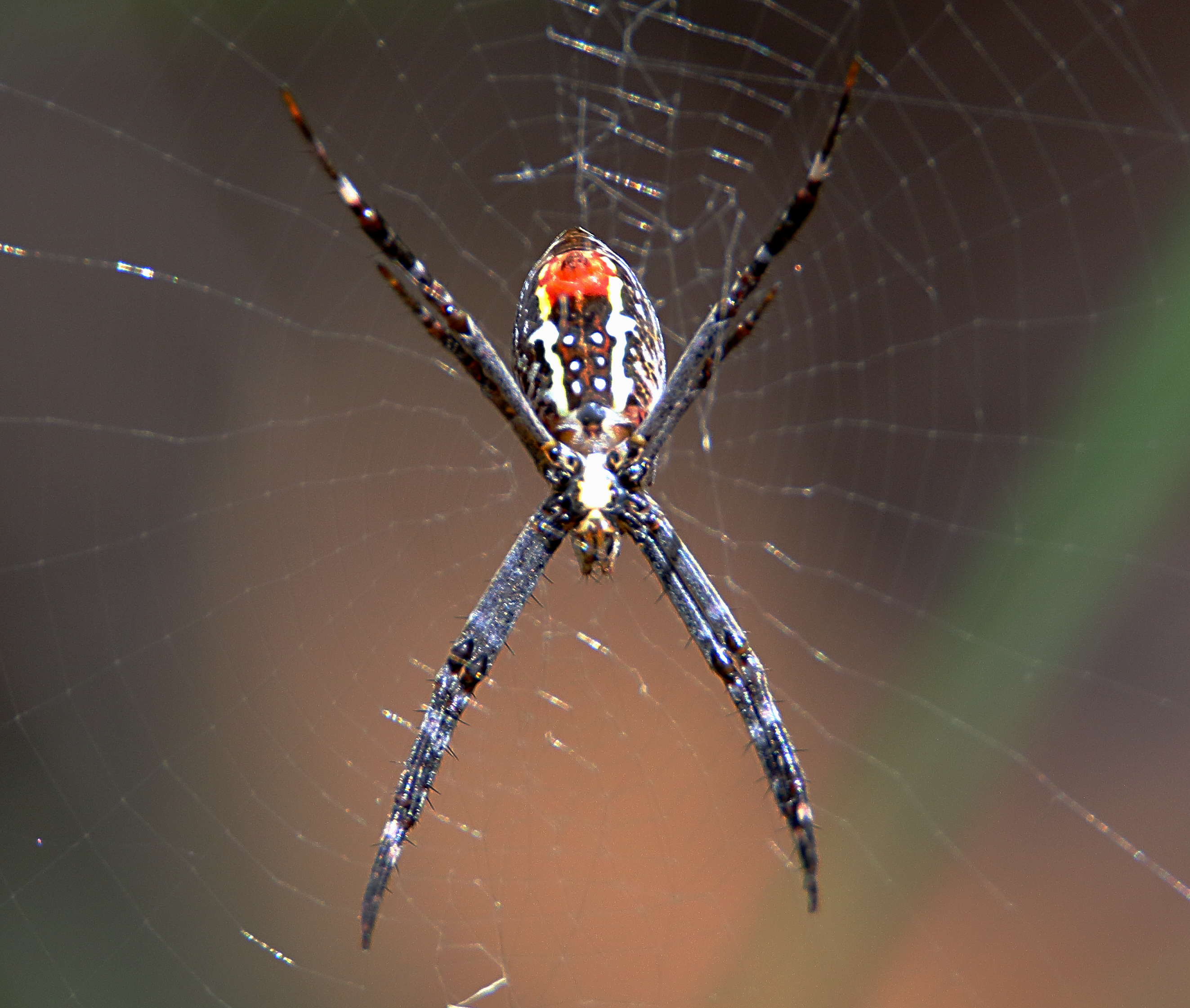
- Ventral view

Scientific classification
- Kingdom: Animalia
- Phylum: Arthropoda
- Subphylum: Chelicerata
- Class: Arachnida
- Order: Araneae
- Infraorder: Araneomorphae
- Family: Araneidae
- Genus: Argiope
- Species: A. radon

Binomial name
- Argiope radon Levi, 1983

= Argiope radon =

Species of spider

Argiope radon is a species of orb web spider native to Australia. It is found in tropical areas of the Northern Territory, Western Australia and Queensland. It is commonly known as the Northern St Andrew's cross spider.

== Description ==
Like most orb-weaving spiders, males are much smaller than females. The female grows to roughly 18 mm-28 mm in body length while male stays tiny at 5 mm-9 mm. The carapace (the hard upper shell portion of their body) is black at the top, gradually fading to a white color towards the outer-parts of the shell. Their sternum (chest) is generally black, except for the middle part, which is white. The dorsum (upper surface) of the abdomen is also white and is covered with white hairs. In addition, the abdomen is framed with a dark black color and has black posterior tips.

Females of this species construct web decorations. Their webs are greatly affected by humidity, but are less affected by temperature changes.

== Habitat and distribution ==
Argiope radon is distributed in the Northern Territory and Queensland in Australia. They are found in semi-arid tropical savannas, which have distinct wet and dry seasons. There were 86 records of Argiope radon listed in Australia as of January 2021. A. radon differs from other Argiope species in that they are found in aggregations around riverbanks and streams. Their web-building occurs near vegetation that overhangs water. They tend to either form aggregations with spiders of the same species or are found as solitary individuals, and their states heavily impact their web decorating abilities.

== Diet ==
=== Adult ===
==== Predatory feeding ====
This spider's model prey are the stingless bees, which are easily attracted to the decorations and colors of the spiders. In addition to chromatic colors, the UV reflecting properties on the abdomen also serve as a way to attract prey. However, in general, prey are more likely to approach webs with decorations rather than those that do not have decorations. There is no significant difference in the amount of prey that can be caught by either solitary or aggregating spiders over a 10-day period.

== Webs ==
=== Web type ===
Like other orb-web spiders, A. radon, creates spiral, circular webs in addition to silk decorations. Their orb-webs typically are oriented along southeast-northwest plane.

=== Prey capture technique ===
The web's architecture plays a significant role in its functions, especially when the force inputted by the prey is high. Hence, the sparse meshwork of larger webs makes them less likely to capture prey. In the high-performing webs, however, the architecture will not be as important.

Though the amount of biomass the webs can capture is unrelated to the size of the web at low prey kinetic energy levels, rare and large prey contribute much less to the amount of biomass that is captured. It is true that there is a selective pathway for how high-performance webs change—large webs with longer radial threads have the ability to capture even more biomass on the web.

=== Construction ===
The effectiveness of webs varies depending on several different factors. The webs' ability to stop an intense amount of force for an organism is not impaired by temperature, but can be affected by extreme cases of humidity. Having a too low or too high of a temperature can potentially counter the effects of the webs in capturing prey. Other factors include gravity and interactions that may dampen webs.

=== Decoration ===
The decorations on spider webs differ based on several factors such as mating and type of spiders. These specific spiders are similar to other Argiope species in that they build silk decorations that are diagonal, starting from the top left of the web to going to the bottom right side. In addition, satiation levels influence the length of web decorations and tendency to form aggregations.

Decorations of aggregating spiders were significantly shorter than the decorations of solitary spiders, and spiders that are in aggregations tend to have more variability in their web decorating abilities than the solitary ones. There are no significant differences in the kleptoparasitic load between aggregating and solitary spiders.

Spiders that are less hungry (or more full) build decorations that are longer in length than those built by less satiated spiders. There is no correlation between satiety and tendency to aggregate.

=== Longevity ===
Due to the tensile properties of these nonlinear patterned webs, the orb-webs are highly functional, even after being damaged. These spiders can rapidly repair any damage to the webs. Hence, their webs last longer than most spiders' webs.

== Reproduction and life cycle ==
=== Fertilization ===
Resting metabolic rate (RMR) of a female's parents does not change how long it takes her to lay an egg sac after mating. However, females with higher RMR values have significantly heavier egg sacs.

=== Brood size ===
As the age at which females lay their offspring increases, the mass of the egg sacs decreases, regardless of the order in which those egg sacs are laid. In general, the size of the eggs for the first egg sac tends to be greater than the size of the second egg. The amount of protein in the eggs, however, does not change with the egg sac order or the age of the female at the time the offspring is born. Usually, total available resources decreases with increased maternal age, which leads to lower egg sac mass and later emerging time for young. But, females are able to compensate for the later emerging time by creating eggs that are bigger in size. This increase in size of the eggs is what allows these offspring to better tolerate starvation.

There is no significant correlation between the time at which offspring emerge and the egg's size and protein content. There is also no significant relationship between the offspring's toleration of starvation and the size of the egg or its protein content.

== Mating ==
=== Mate search behaviour ===
Males tend to prefer the webs of females that are a part of aggregations than those of solitary females. Likewise, males preferred to stay with females that have web decorations over those that do not.

=== Female/male interaction ===
==== Pheromones ====
Female spiders use sex pheromones to send out signals for mating.

==== Courting ====
Male courtship shuttering can influence female mate choice. Courtship behaviours that are less repetitious are courting behaviours that previously did not have much effect on the female's mating preferences.

==== Copulation ====
Having long copulations helps males to increase their effectiveness in genital plugging. Hence, female spiders reduce time spent copulating with lower quality males. Because of the presence of the female choice during copulation, the duration of copulation only plays a minor role in mating success for the male.

==== Sexual cannibalism ====
There is a very high risk of cannibalism during courtship, especially from female web-building spiders. The females are highly aggressive and exhibit sexual cannibalistic behaviours. Males, therefore, are at risk for injury when they choose to approach a female. This risk leads to a strong level of selection for high repeatability in male courtship signals. These signals of high repeatability help to relay an increased amount of information to females about the male's identity and intent. Because females have poor vision, these repeatable vibratory signals are key to reducing the risk of male injury.

== Social behaviour ==
=== Spiderling sociality ===
A. radon are more likely to be found as aggregations rather than as solitary individuals. However, there is no sizable difference between aggregating spiders and solitary spiders in terms of body length, web height, and mesh height. But, there are far more males per female found in aggregating groups of spiders than with solitary spiders.

== Enemies ==
=== Predators ===
The A. radon's model predators are the blue tits. The blue tit's visual system is well-known and about 20% of their diet is composed of spiders. Their methods for prey capturing include the use of UV-specific cues.

== Physiology ==
=== Locomotion ===
Lowered resting metabolic rates (RMR) are favored when spiders are completing activities that require a large amount of energy. However, this does not mean that lower RMR values are favored.

=== Digestion ===
The resting metabolic rate (RMR) of female spiders does not change drastically with age but is significantly affected by whether female spiders have mated or not. For example, mated females have RMRs that are reduced by almost 29-35%. In addition, the RMR for both females and males is positively correlated with the offspring's body mass.

== Bites to humans and animals ==
=== Incidence ===
The Argiope spiders are common spiders in the United States and have minor medical importance. The best way to prevent getting a spider bite is to simply flick the spider. Avoid crushing the spider on the skin because that may incite the spider's reflexive response, causing the spider's fangs to dig into skin.

== Gallery ==
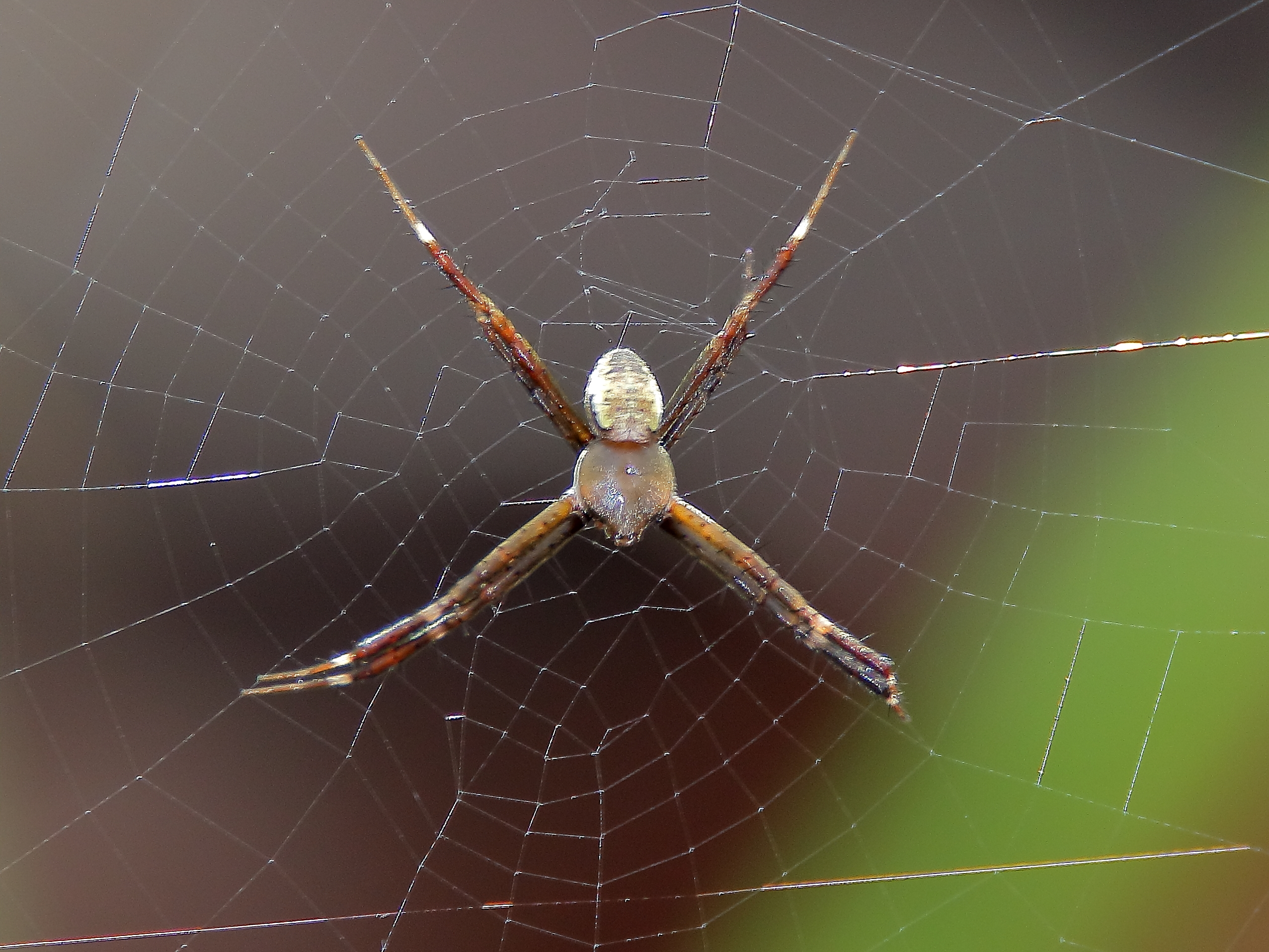
Male, Litchfield National Park

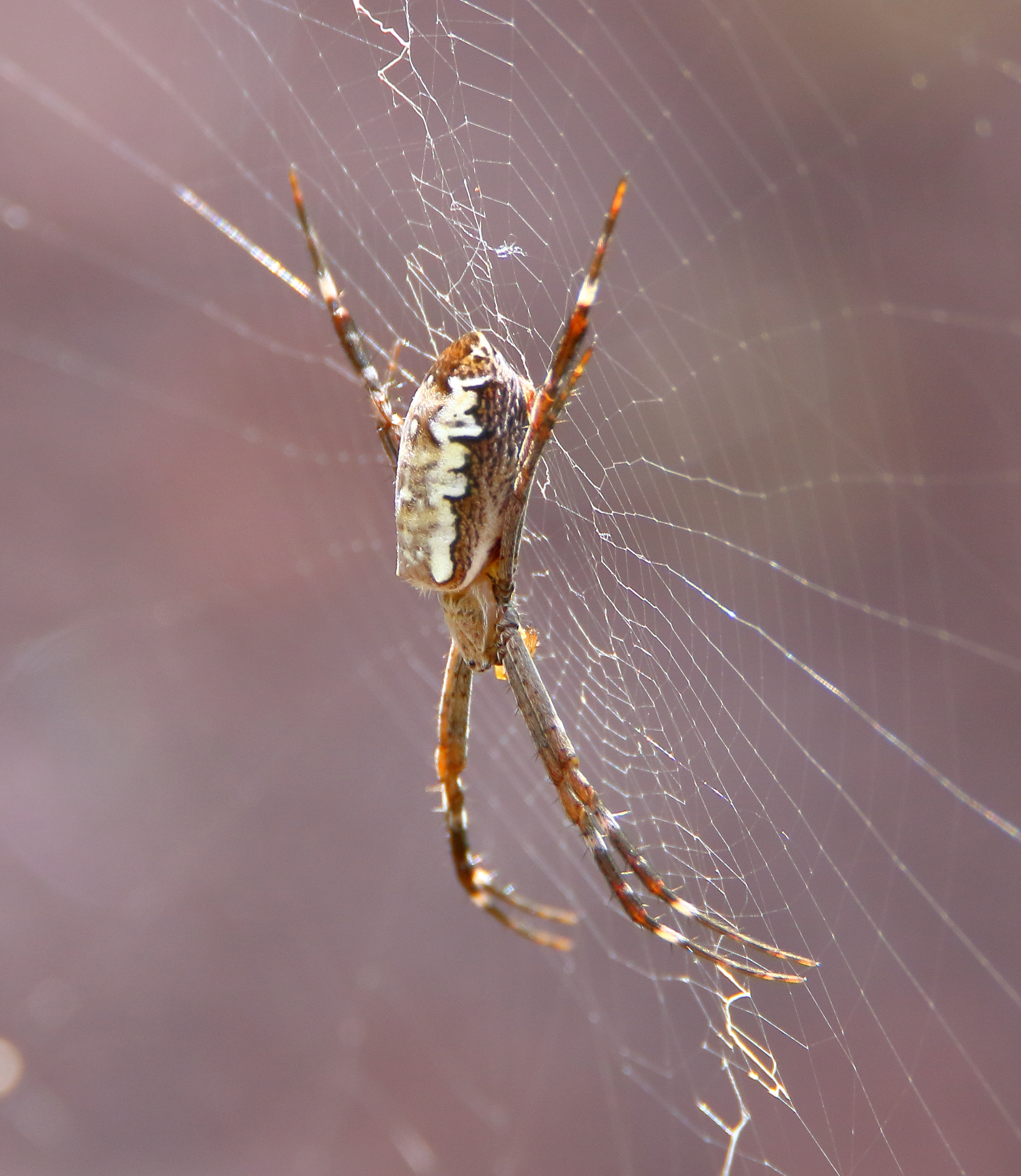
Female, side view
