= Indirect calorimetry =

Measurement of the heat of living organisms through indirect means

Indirect calorimetry metabolic cart measuring oxygen uptake (O_{2}) and carbon dioxide production (CO_{2}) of a spontaneously breathing subject (dilution method with canopy hood).

Indirect calorimetry calculates heat that living organisms produce by measuring either their production of carbon dioxide and nitrogen waste (frequently ammonia in aquatic organisms, or urea in terrestrial ones), or from their consumption of oxygen. Indirect calorimetry estimates the type and rate of substrate utilization and energy metabolism in vivo starting from gas exchange measurements (oxygen consumption and carbon dioxide production during rest and steady-state exercise). This technique provides unique information, is noninvasive, and can be advantageously combined with other experimental methods to investigate numerous aspects of nutrient assimilation, thermogenesis, the energetics of physical exercise, and the pathogenesis of metabolic diseases.

== Scientific background ==
Indirect calorimetry measures O_{2} consumption and CO_{2} production. On the assumption that all the oxygen is used to oxidize degradable fuels and all the CO_{2} thereby evolved is recovered, it is possible to estimate the total amount of energy produced from the chemical energy of nutrients and converted into the chemical energy of ATP, with some loss of energy during the oxidation process. Respiratory indirect calorimetry (IC) is a noninvasive and highly accurate method of metabolic rate, which has an error of less than 1%. It has high reproducibility and has been considered a gold standard method. This method allows estimating BEE and REE as well as identification of energy substrates that are predominantly metabolized by the body at a specific moment. It is based on the indirect measurement of the heat produced by oxidation of macronutrients, which is estimated by monitoring O_{2} consumption and CO_{2} production for a certain period of time. The calorimeter has a gas collector that adapts to the subject and through a unidirectional valve minute by minute collects and quantifies the volume and concentration of O_{2} inspired and CO_{2} expired by the subject. After a volume is met, Resting Energy Expenditure is calculated by the Weir formula and results are displayed in software attached to the system. Another formula used is:

$$M=VO_2\left(\frac{RQ-0.7}{0.3}e_c+\frac{1-RQ}{0.3}e_f\right)$$

where RQ is the respiratory quotient (ratio of volume CO_{2} produced to volume of O_{2} consumed), $e_c$ is 21.13 kilojoules (5.05 kcal), the heat released per litre of oxygen by the oxidation of carbohydrate, and $e_f$ is 19.62 kilojoules (4.69 kcal), the value for fat. This gives the same result as the Weir formula at RQ = 1 (burning only carbohydrates), and almost the same value at RQ = 0.7 (burning only fat).

== History ==
Antoine Lavoisier noted in 1780 that heat production, in some cases, can be predicted from oxygen consumption, using multiple regression. Indirect calorimetry, as we know it, was developed around 1900 as an application of thermodynamics to animal life. Although the development of indirect calorimetry dates back over 200 years, its greatest use has been in the last two decades with the development of total parenteral nutrition, interdisciplinary nutrition support teams, and the production of portable, reliable, relatively inexpensive calorimeters.

== Collection methods ==
Four different gas collection and measurement techniques can be used to perform this test:

- Douglas Bag: Expired respiratory gases are collected on an inflatable airtight bag. After completion of any test using Douglas Bags, gas collected must be analysed for volume and composition.
- Canopy (dilution): The dilution technique is considered the gold standard technology for Resting Energy Expenditure measurement in clinical nutrition. The test lasts just few minutes and consists of making a patient lie down relaxed on a bed or on a comfortable couch, with the head under a transparent hood connected to a pump, which applies an adjustable ventilation through it. Exhaled gas dilutes with the fresh air ventilated under the hood and a sample of this mixture is conveyed to the analysers, through a capillary tube and analysed. Ambient and diluted fractions of O_{2} and CO_{2} are measured for a known ventilation rate, and O_{2} consumption and CO_{2} production are determined and converted into Resting Energy Expenditure.
- Face mask (breath by breath): Indirect calorimetry tests are also often performed with a face mask, which is used to convey exhaled and inhaled gas through a turbine flowmeter able to measure the patient's breath by breath minute ventilation, at the same time a sample of gas is conveyed to the analyser and VO_{2} and VCO_{2} are measured and converted in energy expenditure.
- Interface with a Ventilator (Intensive Care settings): In case the patient is mechanically ventilated, an indirect calorimeter can still measure breath by breath inhaled/exhaled O_{2} and CO_{2} if interfaced with the ventilator through the endotracheal tube.

== Applications ==
Indirect calorimetry provides at least two pieces of information: a measure of energy expenditure or 24-hour caloric requirements as reflected by the Resting Energy Expenditure (REE) and a measure of substrate utilization as reflected in the Respiratory Quotient (RQ). Knowledge of the many factors that affect these values has led to a much broader range of applications. Studies of indirect calorimetry over the past 20 years have led to the characterization of the hypermetabolic stress response to injury and the design of nutritional regimens whose substrates are most efficiently assimilated in different disease processes and organ failure states. Indirect calorimetry has influenced everyday practices of medical and surgical care, such as the warming of burn unit and surgical suites and the weaning of patients from ventilators.
