= Respirometer =

Device for measuring the rate of respiration

- Purpose: measure the rate of respiration

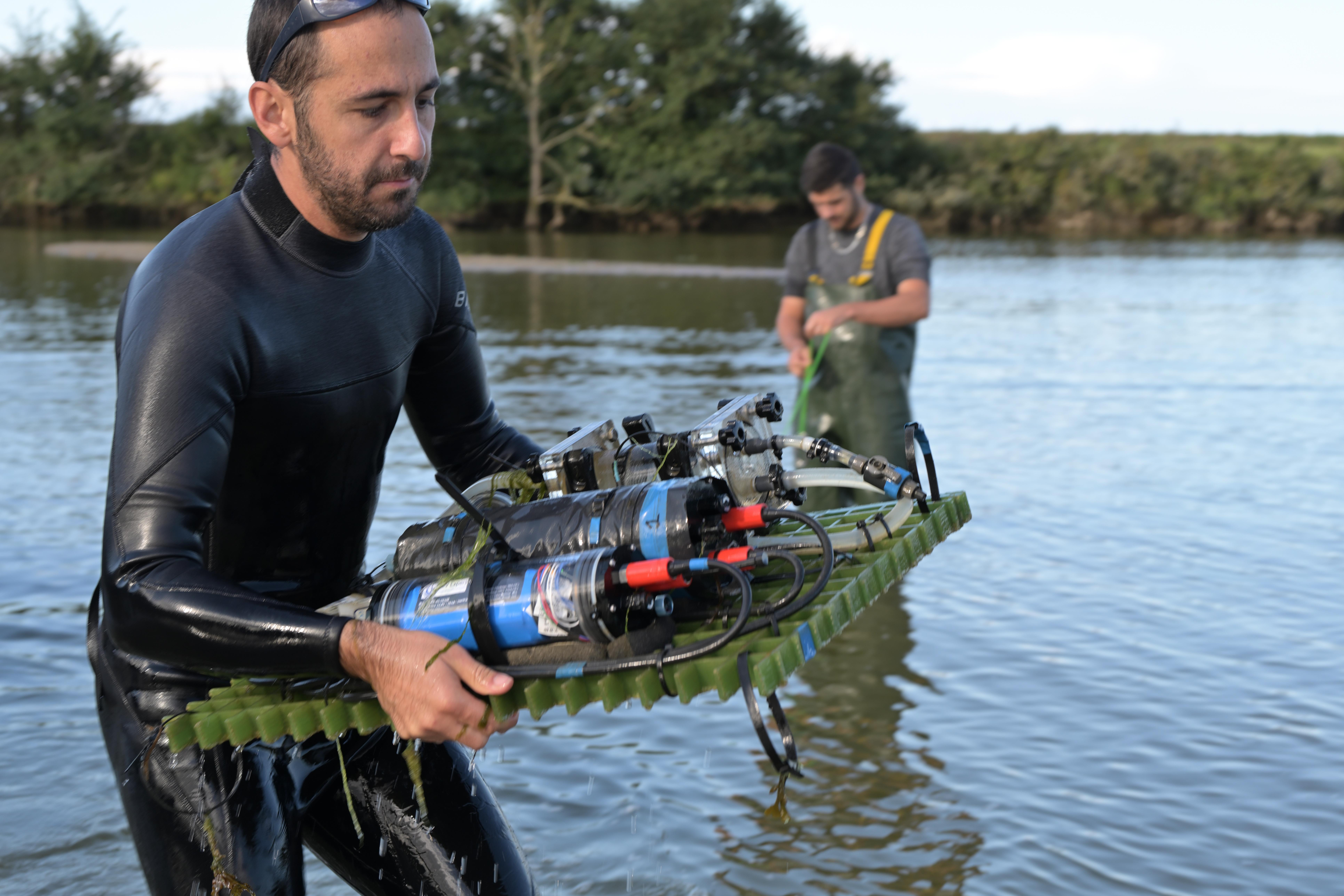
Placement of juvenile sea bass in a field respirometer

A respirometer is a device used to measure the rate of respiration of a living organism by measuring its rate of exchange of oxygen and/or carbon dioxide. They allow investigation into how factors such as age, or chemicals affect the rate of respiration. Respirometers are designed to measure respiration either on the level of a whole animal or plant or on the cellular level. These fields are covered by whole animal and cellular (or mitochondrial) respirometry, respectively.

A simple whole plant respirometer designed to measure oxygen uptake or CO_{2} release consists of a sealed container with the living specimen together with a substance to absorb the carbon dioxide given off during respiration, such as soda lime pellets or cotton wads soaked with potassium hydroxide. The oxygen uptake is detected by manometry. Typically, a U-tube manometer is used, which directly shows the pressure difference between the container and the atmosphere. As an organism takes up O_{2}, it generates a proportionate quantity of CO_{2} (see respiratory quotient), but all the CO_{2} is absorbed by the soda lime. Therefore, all of the drop of pressure in the chamber can be attributed to the drop of O_{2} partial pressure in the container. The rate of change gives a direct and reasonably accurate reading for the organism's rate of respiration.

As changes in temperature or pressure can also affect the displacement of the manometric fluid, a second respirometer identical to the first except with a dead specimen (or something with the same mass as the specimen in place of the organism) is sometimes set up. Subtracting the displacement of the second respirometer from the first allows for control of these factors.

The set up of modern respirometers is described in more detail under respirometry. A respirometer may also be called an oxygraph. Suppliers for whole animal respirometers are e.g. Sable Systems, Respirometer Systems and Applications, Qubit Systems, Eco-environment, Bio-technology, or Challenge Technology; for mitochondrial respirometers, Oroboros Instruments, Hansatech Instruments, or YSI.

== See also ==
- Respiratory rate
- Respirometry
