= Hypermetabolism =

Metabolic disorder in humans

Hypermetabolism is defined as an elevated resting energy expenditure (REE) > 110% of predicted REE. Hypermetabolism is accompanied by a variety of internal and external symptoms, most notably extreme weight loss, and can also be a symptom in itself, being generally caused from severe trauma, leaving the body in a state of constant energy deprivation. This state of increased metabolic activity can signal underlying issues, especially hyperthyroidism. Patients with Fatal familial insomnia can also present with hypermetabolism.

== Signs and symptoms ==
Symptoms may last for days, weeks, or months until the disorder is healed. The most apparent sign of hypermetabolism is an abnormally high intake of calories followed by continuous weight loss. Internal symptoms of hypermetabolism include: peripheral insulin resistance, elevated catabolism of protein, carbohydrates and triglycerides, and a negative nitrogen balance in the body. Outward symptoms of hypermetabolism may include:

- Weight loss
- Anemia
- Fatigue
- Elevated heart rate
- Irregular heartbeat
- Insomnia
- Dysautonomia
- Shortness of breath
- Muscle weakness
- Excessive sweating

== Pathophysiology ==
During the acute phase, the liver redirects protein synthesis, causing up-regulation of certain proteins and down-regulation of others. Measuring the serum level of proteins that are up- and down-regulated during the acute phase can reveal extremely important information about the patient's nutritional state. The most important up-regulated protein is C-reactive protein, which can rapidly increase 20- to 1,000-fold during the acute phase. Hypermetabolism also causes expedited catabolism of carbohydrates, proteins, and triglycerides in order to meet the increased metabolic demands.

== Diagnosis ==
Quantitation by indirect calorimetry, as opposed to the Harris-Benedict equation, is needed to accurately measure REE in cancer patients.

== Differential diagnosis ==
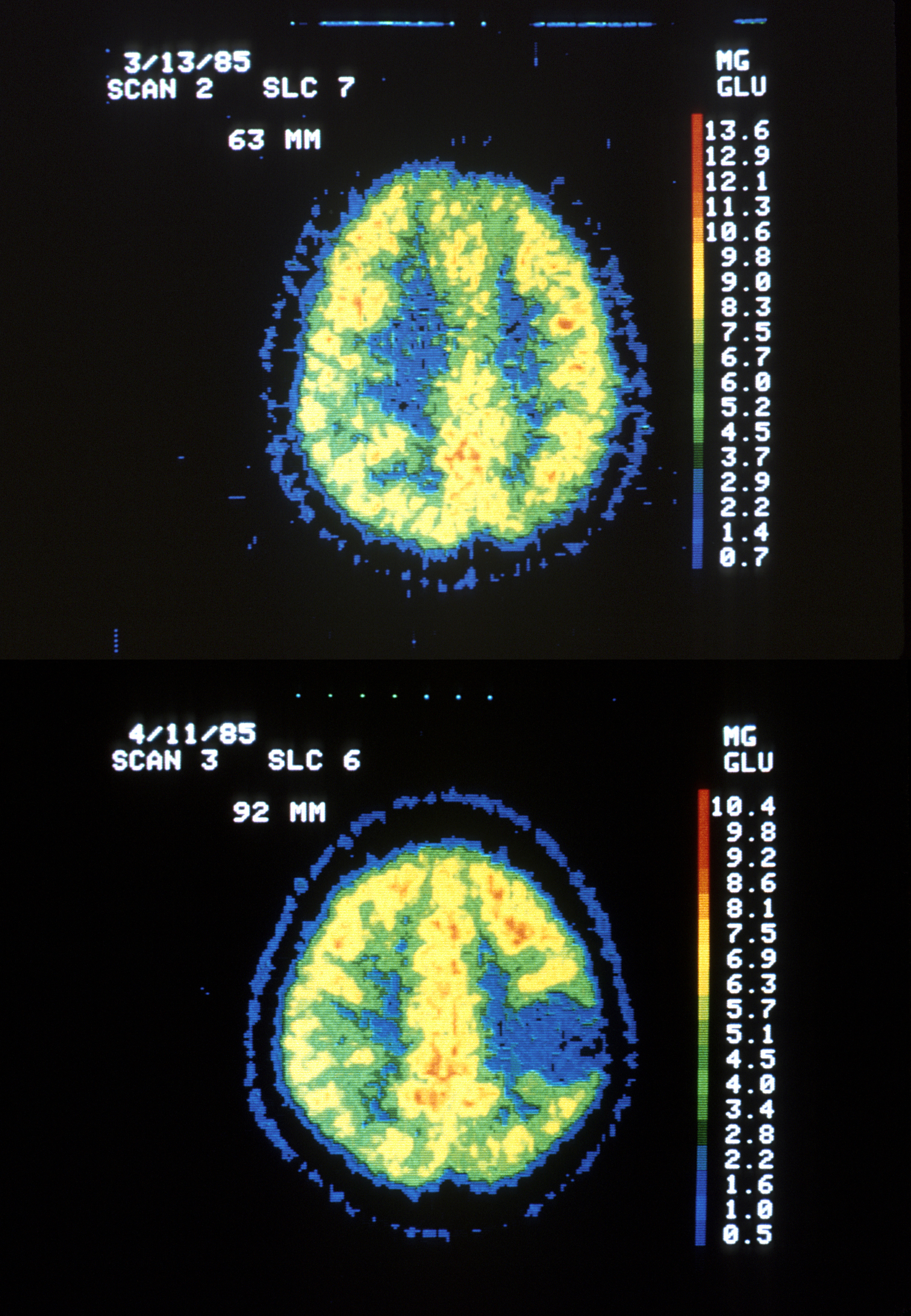
Hypermetabolism is one symptom of Astrocytoma. Shown above is a PET scan of hypermetabolic Astrocytoma in the brain.

Many different illnesses can cause an increase in metabolic activity as the body combats illness and disease in order to heal itself. Hypermetabolism is a common symptom of various pathologies. Some of the most prevalent diseases characterized by hypermetabolism are listed below.

- Hyperthyroidism: Manifestation: An overactive thyroid often causes a state of increased metabolic activity.
- Friedreich's ataxia: Manifestation: Local cerebral metabolic activity is increased extensively as the disease progresses.
- Fatal familial insomnia: Manifestation: Hypermetabolism in the thalamus occurs and disrupts sleep spindle formation that occurs there.
- Graves' disease: Manifestation: Excess hypermetabolically-induced thyroid hormone activates sympathetic pathways, causing the eyelids to retract and remain constantly elevated.
- Anorexia and bulimia: Manifestation: The prolonged stress put on the body as a result of these eating disorders forces the body into starvation mode. Some patients recovering from these disorders experience hypermetabolism until they resume normal diets.
- Astrocytoma: Manifestation: Causes hypermetabolic lesions in the brain

== Treatment ==
Ibuprofen, polyunsaturated fatty acids, and beta-blockers have been reported in some preliminary studies to decrease REE, which may allow patients to meet their caloric needs and gain weight.
