= Alveolar gas equation =

Formula for the partial pressure of alveolar oxygen

The alveolar gas equation is the method for calculating partial pressure of alveolar oxygen (p_{A}O_{2}). The equation is used in assessing if the lungs are properly transferring oxygen into the blood. The alveolar air equation is not widely used in clinical medicine, probably because of the complicated appearance of its classic forms. The partial pressure of oxygen (pO_{2}) in the pulmonary alveoli is required to calculate both the alveolar-arterial gradient of oxygen and the amount of right-to-left cardiac shunt, which are both clinically useful quantities. However, it is not practical to take a sample of gas from the alveoli in order to directly measure the partial pressure of oxygen. The alveolar gas equation allows the calculation of the alveolar partial pressure of oxygen from data that is practically measurable. It was first characterized in 1946.

== Assumptions ==
The equation relies on the following assumptions:

- Inspired gas contains no carbon dioxide (CO_{2})
- Nitrogen (and any other gases except oxygen) in the inspired gas are in equilibrium with their dissolved states in the blood
- Inspired and alveolar gases obey the ideal gas law
- Carbon dioxide (CO_{2}) in the alveolar gas is in equilibrium with the arterial blood i.e. that the alveolar and arterial partial pressures are equal
- The alveolar gas is saturated with water

== Equation ==
$$p_A\ce{O2} = F_I\ce{O2}(P_\ce{ATM} - p\ce{H2O}) - \frac{p_a\ce{CO2}(1 - F_I\ce{O2}(1 - \ce{RER}))} \ce{RER}$$

If F_{i}O_{2} is small, or more specifically if $F_I\ce{O2}(1-\ce{RER}) \ll 1$ then the equation can be simplified to:

$$p_A\ce{O2} \approx F_I\ce{O2}(P_\ce{ATM} - p\ce{H2O}) - \frac{p_a\ce{CO2}} \ce{RER}$$

where:

| Quantity | Description | Sample value |
|---|---|---|
| $p_A\ce{O2}$ | The alveolar partial pressure of oxygen ($p\ce{O2}$) | 107 mmHg (14.2 kPa) |
| $F_I\ce{O2}$ | The fraction of inspired gas that is oxygen (expressed as a decimal). | 0.21 |
| $P_{ATM}$ | The prevailing atmospheric pressure | 760 mmHg (101 kPa) |
| $p\ce{H2O}$ | The saturated vapour pressure of water at body temperature and the prevailing atmospheric pressure | 47 mmHg (6.25 kPa) |
| $p_a\ce{CO2}$ | The arterial partial pressure of carbon dioxide ($p\ce{CO2}$ ) | 40 mmHg (5.33 kPa) |
| $\text{RER}$ | The respiratory exchange ratio | 0.8 |

Sample Values given for air at sea level at 37 °C.

Doubling F_{i}O_{2} will double p_{i}O_{2}.

Other possible equations exist to calculate the alveolar air.

$$\begin{align}
p_A \ce{O2} & =  F_I \ce{O2} \left(PB - p\ce{H2O}\right) - p_A \ce{CO2} \left(F_I \ce{O2} + \frac{1 - F_I \ce{O2}}{R}\right) \\[4pt]
& = p_I \ce{O2} - p_A \ce{CO2} \left(F_I \ce{O2} + \frac{1 - F_I \ce{O2}}{R}\right) \\[4pt]
& = p_I \ce{O2} - \frac{V_T}{V_T - V_D}\left(p_I \ce{O2} - p_E \ce{O2}\right) \\[4pt]
& = \frac{p_E \ce{O2} - p_I \ce{O2} \left(\frac{V_D}{V_T}\right)}{1 - \frac{V_D}{V_T}}
\end{align}$$

=== Abbreviated alveolar air equation ===
$$p_A \ce{O2} = \frac{p_E \ce{O2} - p_i \ce{O2} \frac{V_D}{V_T}}{1- \frac{V_D}{V_T}}$$
p_{A}O_{2}, p_{E}O_{2}, and p_{i}O_{2} are the partial pressures of oxygen in alveolar, expired, and inspired gas, respectively, and VD/VT is the ratio of physiologic dead space over tidal volume.

=== Respiratory quotient (R) ===
$$R = \frac{p_E \ce{CO2} (1 - F_I \ce{O2})}{p_i \ce{O2} - p_E \ce{O2} - (p_E \ce{CO2} * F_i \ce{O2})}$$

=== Physiologic dead space over tidal volume (VD/VT) ===
$$\frac{V_D}{V_T} = \frac{p_A \ce{CO2} - p_E \ce{CO2} }{p_A\ce{CO2} }$$

== Intuitive explanation ==
As it is not practical to take a sample of gas from the alveoli in order to directly measure the partial pressure of oxygen, the alveolar gas equation allows the calculation of the alveolar partial pressure of oxygen from data that is practically measurable.

Firstly, the partial pressure of inhaled oxygen is simply the fraction of inhaled oxygen multiplied by the atmospheric pressure $F_I\ce{O2}*P_\ce{ATM}$. Once oxygen enters the airways, we must account for the partial pressure of water vapor which is assumed to reach 100% saturation, hence $F_I\ce{O2}(P_\ce{ATM} - p\ce{H2O})$. Once the humidified atmospheric air reaches the alveoli, gas exchange takes place so we need to consider the amount of $\ce{O2}$ that enters the blood and $\ce{CO2}$ that leaves the blood. Conveniently, the arterial blood $p_a\ce{CO2}$ equals the alveolar blood $p_A\ce{CO2}$ and so this is a value we know. It would also be convenient if the same number of $\ce{CO2}$ and $\ce{O2}$ molecules were exchanged, in which case the alveolar gas equation would simply be $p_A\ce{O2} \approx F_I\ce{O2}(P_\ce{ATM} - p\ce{H2O}) - p_a\ce{CO2}$. However in reality the number of $\ce{CO2}$ molecules exchanged differs slightly from the number of $\ce{O2}$ molecules, according to the respiratory exchange ratio. Hence the alveolar gas equation becomes:

$$p_A\ce{O2} \approx F_I\ce{O2}(P_\ce{ATM} - p\ce{H2O}) - \frac{p_a\ce{CO2}} \ce{RER}$$

== See also ==
- Pulmonary gas pressures
