= Weir formula =

The Weir formula is a formula used in indirect calorimetry, relating metabolic rate to oxygen consumption and carbon dioxide production. According to original source, it says:

Metabolic rate (kcal per day) = 1.440 (3.9 VO_{2} + 1.1 VCO_{2})

where VO_{2} is oxygen consumption in litres per minute and VCO_{2} is the rate of carbon dioxide production in litres per minute. The formula can also be written for units of calories per day where VO_{2} is oxygen consumption expressed in millilitres per minute and VCO_{2} is the rate of carbon dioxide production in millilitres per minute.

Another source gives

Energy (kcal/min) = (respiration in L/min times change in percentage oxygen) / 20

This corresponds to:

Metabolic rate (cal per minute) = 5 (VO_{2} in mL/min)
