= Respiratory quotient =

Ratio of carbon dioxide produced by the body to oxygen consumed by the body

The respiratory quotient (RQ or respiratory coefficient) is a dimensionless number used in calculations of basal metabolic rate (BMR) when estimated from carbon dioxide production. It is calculated from the ratio of carbon dioxide produced by the body to oxygen consumed by the body, when the body is in a steady state. Such measurements, like measurements of oxygen uptake, are forms of indirect calorimetry. It is measured using a respirometer. The respiratory quotient value indicates which macronutrients are being metabolized, as different energy pathways are used for fats, carbohydrates, and proteins. If metabolism consists solely of lipids, the respiratory quotient is approximately 0.7, for proteins it is approximately 0.8, and for carbohydrates it is 1.0. Most of the time, however, energy consumption is composed of both fats and carbohydrates. The approximate respiratory quotient of a mixed diet is 0.8. Some of the other factors that may affect the respiratory quotient are energy balance, circulating insulin, and insulin sensitivity.

It can be used in the alveolar gas equation.

== Respiratory exchange ratio ==
The respiratory exchange ratio (RER) is the ratio between the metabolic production of carbon dioxide (CO_{2}) and the uptake of oxygen (O_{2}).

The ratio is determined by comparing exhaled gases to room air. Measuring this ratio is equal to RQ only at rest or during mild to moderate aerobic exercise without the accumulation of lactate. The loss of accuracy during more intense anaerobic exercise is among others due to factors including the bicarbonate buffer system. The body tries to compensate for the accumulation of lactate and minimize the acidification of the blood by expelling more CO_{2} through the respiratory system.

The RER can exceed 1.0 during intense exercise. A value above 1.0 cannot be attributed to the substrate metabolism, but rather to the aforementioned factors regarding bicarbonate buffering. Calculation of RER is commonly done in conjunction with exercise tests such as the VO_{2} max test. This can be used as an indicator that the participants are nearing exhaustion and the limits of their cardio-respiratory system. An RER greater than or equal to 1.0 is often used as a secondary endpoint criterion of a VO_{2} max test.

== Calculation ==
The respiratory quotient (RQ) is the ratio:

RQ = CO_{2 eliminated} / O_{2 consumed}

where the term "eliminated" refers to carbon dioxide (CO_{2}) removed from the body in a steady state.

In this calculation, the CO_{2} and O_{2} must be given in the same units, and in quantities proportional to the number of molecules. Acceptable inputs would be either moles, or else volumes of gas at standard temperature and pressure.

Many metabolized substances are compounds containing only the elements carbon, hydrogen, and oxygen. Examples include fatty acids, glycerol, carbohydrates, deamination products, and ethanol. For complete oxidation of such compounds, the chemical equation is

C_{x}H_{y}O_{z} + (x + y/4 - z/2) O_{2} → x CO_{2} + (y/2) H_{2}O

and thus metabolism of this compound gives an RQ of x/(x + y/4 - z/2).

For glucose, with the molecular formula, C_{6}H_{12}O_{6}, the complete oxidation equation is C_{6}H_{12}O_{6} + 6 O_{2} → 6 CO_{2} + 6 H_{2}O. Thus, the RQ= 6 CO_{2}/ 6 O_{2}=1.

For oxidation of a fatty acid molecule, namely palmitic acid:

$$23\ \mathrm O_2 + \mathrm C_{16}\mathrm H_{32}\mathrm O_2 \to 16\ \mathrm{CO}_2 + 16\ \mathrm H_2\mathrm O + 129\ \mathrm{ATP}$$
$$\mathrm{RER} = \frac{\mathrm{VCO}_2}{\mathrm{VO}_2} = \frac{16\ \mathrm{CO}_2}{23\ \mathrm O_2} \approx 0.7$$

A RQ near 0.7 indicates that fat is the predominant fuel source, a value of 1.0 is indicative of carbohydrate being the predominant fuel source, and a value between 0.7 and 1.0 suggests a mix of both fat and carbohydrate. In general a mixed diet corresponds with an RER of approximately 0.8. For fats, the RQ depends on the specific fatty acids present. Amongst the commonly stored fatty acids in vertebrates, RQ varies from 0.692 (stearic acid) to as high as 0.759 (docosahexaenoic acid). Historically, it was assumed that 'average fat' had an RQ of about 0.71, and this holds true for most mammals including humans. However, a recent survey showed that aquatic animals, especially fish, have fat that should yield higher RQs on oxidation, reaching as high as 0.73 due to high amounts of docosahexaenoic acid.

The range of respiratory coefficients for organisms in metabolic balance usually ranges from 1.0 (representing the value expected for pure carbohydrate oxidation) to ~0.7 (the value expected for pure fat oxidation). In general, molecules that are more oxidized (e.g., glucose) require less oxygen to be fully metabolized and, therefore, have higher respiratory quotients. Conversely, molecules that are less oxidized (e.g., fatty acids) require more oxygen for their complete metabolism and have lower respiratory quotients. See BMR for a discussion of how these numbers are derived. A mixed diet of fat and carbohydrate results in an average value between these numbers.

RQ value corresponds to a caloric value for each liter (L) of CO_{2} produced. If O_{2} consumption numbers are available, they are usually used directly, since they are more direct and reliable estimates of energy production.

RQ as measured includes a contribution from the energy produced from protein. However, due to the complexity of the various ways in which different amino acids can be metabolized, no single RQ can be assigned to the oxidation of protein in the diet.

Insulin, which increases lipid storage and decreases fat oxidation, is positively associated with increases in the respiratory quotient. A positive energy balance will also lead to an increased respiratory quotient.

== Applications ==
Practical applications of the respiratory quotient can be found in severe cases of chronic obstructive pulmonary disease, in which patients spend a significant amount of energy on respiratory effort. By increasing the proportion of fats in the diet, the respiratory quotient is driven down, causing a relative decrease in the amount of CO_{2} produced. This reduces the respiratory burden to eliminate CO_{2}, thereby reducing the amount of energy spent on respirations.

Respiratory Quotient can be used as an indicator of over or underfeeding. Underfeeding, which forces the body to utilize fat stores, will lower the respiratory quotient, while overfeeding, which causes lipogenesis, will increase it. Underfeeding is marked by a respiratory quotient below 0.85, while a respiratory quotient greater than 1.0 indicates overfeeding. This is particularly important in patients with compromised respiratory systems, as an increased respiratory quotient significantly corresponds to increased respiratory rate and decreased tidal volume, placing compromised patients at a significant risk.

Because of its role in metabolism, respiratory quotient can be used in analysis of liver function and diagnosis of liver disease. In patients with liver cirrhosis, non-protein respiratory quotient (npRQ) values act as good indicators in the prediction of overall survival rate. Patients having a npRQ < 0.85 show considerably lower survival rates as compared to patients with a npRQ > 0.85. A decrease in npRQ corresponds to a decrease in glycogen storage by the liver. Similar research indicates that non-alcoholic fatty liver diseases are also accompanied by a low respiratory quotient value, and the non protein respiratory quotient value was a good indication of disease severity.

Recently the respiratory quotient is also used from aquatic scientists to illuminate its environmental applications. Experimental studies with natural bacterioplankton using different single substrates suggested that RQ is linked to the elemental composition of the respired compounds. By this way, it is demonstrated that bacterioplankton RQ is not only a practical aspect of Bacterioplankton Respiration determination, but also a major ecosystem state variable that provides unique information about aquatic ecosystem functioning. Based on the stoichiometry of the different metabolized substrates, the scientists can predict that dissolved oxygen (O_{2}) and carbon dioxide (CO_{2}) in aquatic ecosystems should covary inversely due to the processing of photosynthesis and respiration. Using this quotient we could shed light on the metabolic behavior and the simultaneous roles of chemical and physical forcing that shape the biogeochemistry of aquatic ecosystems.

Moving from a molecular and cellular level to an ecosystem level, various processes account for the exchange of O_{2} and CO_{2} between the biosphere and atmosphere. Field measurements of the concurrent consumption of oxygen (-ΔO_{2}) and production of carbon dioxide (ΔCO_{2}) can be used to derive an apparent respiratory quotient (ARQ). This value reflects a cumulative effect of not only the aerobic respiration of all organisms (microorganisms and higher consumers) in the sample, but also all the other biogeochemical processes which consume O_{2} without a corresponding CO_{2} production and vice versa influencing the observed RQ.

== Respiratory quotients of some substances ==
Name of the substance	Respiratory Quotient
Carbohydrates	1
Proteins	0.8 - 0.9
Ketones (eucaloric)	0.73
Ketones (hypocaloric)	0.66
Triolein (Fat)	0.71
Oleic acid (Fat)	0.71
Tripalmitin (Fat)	0.7
Malic acid	1.33
Tartaric acid	1.6
Oxalic acid	4.0

== See also ==
- Indirect calorimetry – Measurement of the heat of living organisms through indirect means
- Fick principle – Principle applied to the measurement of blood flow to an organ
