= Respirometry =

Estimation of metabolic rates by measuring heat production

Respirometry is a general term that encompasses a number of techniques for obtaining estimates of the rates of metabolism of vertebrates, invertebrates, plants, tissues, cells, or microorganisms via an indirect measure of heat production (calorimetry).

== Whole-animal metabolic rates ==
The metabolism of an animal is estimated by determining rates of carbon dioxide production (VCO_{2}) and oxygen consumption (VO_{2}) of individual animals, either in a closed or an open-circuit respirometry system. Two measures are typically obtained: standard (SMR) or basal metabolic rate (BMR) and maximal rate (VO2max). SMR is measured while the animal is at rest (but not asleep) under specific laboratory (temperature, hydration) and subject-specific conditions (e.g., size or allometry, age, reproduction status, post-absorptive to avoid thermic effect of food). VO_{2}max is typically determined during aerobic exercise at or near physiological limits. In contrast, field metabolic rate (FMR) refers to the metabolic rate of an unrestrained, active animal in nature. Whole-animal metabolic rates refer to these measures without correction for body mass. If SMR or BMR values are divided by the body mass value for the animal, then the rate is termed mass-specific. It is this mass-specific value that one typically hears in comparisons among species.

=== Closed respirometry ===
Respirometry depends on a "what goes in must come out" principle. Consider a closed system first. Imagine that we place a mouse into an air-tight container. The air sealed in the container initially contains the same composition and proportions of gases that were present in the room: 20.95% O_{2}, 0.04% CO_{2}, water vapor (the exact amount depends on air temperature, see dew point), 78% (approximately) N_{2}, 0.93% argon and a variety of trace gases making up the rest (see Earth's atmosphere). As time passes, the mouse in the chamber produces CO_{2} and water vapor, but extracts O_{2} from the air in proportion to its metabolic demands. Therefore, as long as we know the volume of the system, the difference between the concentrations of O_{2} and CO_{2} at the start when we sealed the mouse into the chamber (the baseline or reference conditions) compared to the amounts present after the mouse has breathed the air at a later time must be the amounts of CO_{2}/O_{2} produced/consumed by the mouse. Nitrogen and argon are inert gasses and therefore their fractional amounts are unchanged by the respiration of the mouse. In a closed system, the environment will eventually become hypoxic.

=== Open respirometry ===
For an open-system, design constraints include washout characteristics of the animal chamber and sensitivity of the gas analyzers. However, the basic principle remains the same: What goes in must come out. The primary distinction between an open and closed system is that the open system flows air through the chamber (i.e., air is pushed or pulled by pump) at a rate that constantly replenishes the O_{2} depleted by the animal while removing the CO_{2} and water vapor produced by the animal. The volumetric flow rate must be high enough to ensure that the animal never consumes all of the oxygen present in the chamber while at the same time, the rate must be low enough so that the animal consumes enough O_{2} for detection. For a 20 g mouse, flow rates of about 200 ml/min through 500 ml containers would provide a good balance. At this flow rate, about 40 ml of O_{2} is brought to the chamber and the entire volume of air in the chamber is exchanged within 5 minutes. For other smaller animals, chamber volumes can be much smaller and flow rates would be adjusted down as well. Note that for warm-blooded or endothermic animals (birds and mammals), chamber sizes and or flow rates would be selected to accommodate their higher metabolic rates.

==== Calculations ====
Calculating rates of VO_{2} and/or VCO_{2} requires knowledge of the flow rates into and out of the chamber, plus fractional concentrations of the gas mixtures into and out of the animal chamber. In general, metabolic rates are calculated from steady-state conditions (i.e., animal's metabolic rate is assumed to be constant). To know the rates of oxygen consumed, one needs to know the location of the flow meter relative to the animal chamber (if positioned before the chamber, the flow meter is "upstream," if positioned after the chamber, the flow meter is "downstream"), and whether or not reactive gases are present (e.g., CO_{2}, water, methane, see inert gas).

For an open system with upstream flow meter, water (e.g., anhydrous calcium sulfate) and CO_{2} removed prior to the oxygen analyzer, a suitable equation is

$$\ce{VO2 = \frac {\mathit{FR} \cdot (\mathit F_{in}O2 - \mathit F_{ex}O2)} {1 - \mathit F_{ex}O2}}$$

For an open system with downstream flow meter, water and CO_{2} removed prior to the oxygen analyzer, a suitable equation is

$$\ce{VO2 = \frac {\mathit{FR} \cdot (\mathit F_{in}O2 - \mathit F_{ex}O2)} {1 - \mathit F_{in}O2}}$$

where

- FR is the volumetric flow rate adjusted to STP (see Standard conditions for temperature and pressure)
- F_{in}O_{2} is the fractional amount of oxygen present in the incurrent air stream (the baseline or reference), and
- F_{ex}O_{2} is the fractional amount of oxygen present in the excurrent air stream (what the animal has consumed relative to baseline per unit time).

For example, values for BMR of a 20 g mouse (Mus musculus) might be FR = 200 mL/min, and readings of fractional concentration of O_{2} from an oxygen analyzer are F_{in}O_{2} = 0.2095, F_{ex}O_{2} = 0.2072. The calculated rate of oxygen consumption is 0.58 mL/min or 35 mL/hour. Assuming an enthalpy of combustion for O_{2} of 20.1 joules per milliliter, we would then calculate the heat production (and therefore metabolism) for the mouse as 703.5 J/h.

=== Respirometry equipment ===
For open flow system, the list of equipment and parts is long compared to the components of a closed system, but the chief advantage of the open system is that it permits continuous recording of metabolic rate. The risk of hypoxia is also much less in an open system.

Pumps for air flow

- Vacuum Pump: a pump is needed to push (i.e., upstream location) or pull (i.e., downstream location) air into and through the animal chamber and respirometry flow-through system.
- Subsample pump: To pull air through the analyzers, a small, stable, reliable pump is used.

Flow meter and flow controllers

- Bubble flow meters: A simple, yet highly accurate way to measure flow rates involves timing movement of bubbles of soap film up glass tubes between marks of known volume. The glass tube is connected at the bottom (for push systems) or at the top (for pull systems) to the air stream. A small rubber pipette bulb attached at the base of the tube acts as both a reservoir and delivery system for the soap bubbles. Operation is simple. First, wet the glass surface along the path bubbles travel (e.g., press the bulb so that copious amounts of soap are pushed up the glass by the air flow) to provide a virtually friction-free surface. Second, pinch the bulb so that one clean bubble is produced. With a stopwatch in hand, record the time required for the bubble to travel between marks on the glass. Note the volume recorded on the upper mark (e.g., 125 = 125 ml), divide the volume by the time required to travel between marks and the result is the flow rate (ml/s). These instruments can be purchased from a variety of sources, but they may also be constructed from appropriate-sized, glass volumetric pipettes.
- Acrylic flow meters : Under some circumstances of high flow rates we may use simple acrylic flow meters (0–2.5 liters/min) to control the flow rates through the metabolic chambers. The meters are located upstream from the metabolic chambers. The flow meters are simple to use but should be calibrated twice daily for use in the respirometry system: once before recording begins (but after the animal has been sealed inside the chamber!!) and again at the end of the recording (before the animal is removed from the chamber). Calibration must be done with a bubble flow meter because the calibration marks on the acrylic meters are only approximate. For proper calibration of flow rates remember that both barometric pressure and temperature of the air streaming through the flow meter (which we assume to be equal to room temperature) must be recorded.
- Mass flow meters: The equations required for calculating rates of oxygen consumption or carbon dioxide production assume that the flow rates into and out of the chambers are known exactly. We use mass flow meters which have the advantage of yielding flow rates independent of temperature and air pressure. Therefore, these flow rates can be considered to be corrected to standard conditions (Standard Temperature Pressure). We only measure and control flow at one location—downstream from the chamber. Therefore, we must assume that the inflow and outflow rates are identical. However, during construction of the respirometry system, flow rate must be measured at all steps, across all connections, to verify integrity of flow.
- Needle valves: Mass flow meters may be purchased with mass flow controllers which permit setting flow rates. These are expensive, however. Respirometry research often will attempt to measure more than one animal at a time, which would necessitate one chamber per animal and thus controlled flow through each chamber. An alternative and more cost-effective method to control flow would be via stainless steel or carbon steel needle valves. Needle valves plus mass flow meters provides a cost-effective means to achieve desired flow rates. The valves cost about $20.

Tubing and chambers

- Tubing and connections : Various kinds of tubing can be used to connect the components of the respirometry system to and from the animal chamber. A variety of kinds of flexible tubing may be used, depending on the characteristics of the system. Acetyl, Bev-A-Line, Kynar, nylon, Tygon tubing and connectors may be used in regions of the system where oxidizing atmospheres are low (e.g., background levels of ozone only); Teflon tubing would be recommended if there is an expectation for appreciable amounts of ozone to be present because it is inert to ozone. Teflon tubes are more costly and lack flexibility.
- Metabolic chambers: Chambers may be glass jars with rubber stoppers for lids; syringe barrels for small animals and insects; or constructed from Plexiglas. Ideally, chambers should be constructed from inert materials; for example, the acrylic plastics can absorb O_{2} and may be a poor choice for respirometry with very small insects. Chambers need to be constructed in a manner that yields rapid mixing of gases within the chamber. The simplest metabolic chamber for a small vertebrate might be a glass jar with a stopper. The stoppers are fitted with two ports: short extensions of Teflon tubing are provided for line connections. Teflon tube extensions are pushed through the bulkhead and the line connection is finished by attaching a small hose clip to the base of the Teflon tube extension. Additionally, an extension to the inlet port inside the jar should be provided—this ensures that the animal's expiratory gases are not washed away by the in flow stream. The animal is sealed inside and the rubber stopper is held in place with Velcro straps. If an upstream system is used, any metabolic chamber leak will result in loss of animal air and, therefore, an underestimate of the animal's metabolic rate. When you close an animal inside a metabolic chamber, attention must be paid to the seal. To ensure tight seals before closing the lid, firmly work the stopper into the jar and make sure that it is even. Use 1–2 straps (2 are better) and pull tightly. Acrylic (Plexiglas) chambers will be constructed for some uses, but precise engineering will be needed to ensure proper seating; gaskets will help, and judicious use of tight-fitting clamps will minimize leaks.
- Scrubbing tubes: Water before and after the animal chamber must be removed. One arrangement would use a large acrylic column of Drierite (8 mesh (scale), i.e., relatively coarse) upstream (before the push pump, before the animal chamber) to dry incurrent airstream and several tubes with smaller mesh (10–20, i.e., relatively fine) Drierite to remove water after the animal chamber. To prepare a scrubbing tube, make sure there is a small amount of cotton at either end of the tube to prevent dust particles from traveling to the analyzers. Use small amounts of cotton, say around 0.005 g, just enough to keep the dust out of the tubing. Large amounts of cotton will block air flow when/if it gets damp. Pour the Drierite into the tube with a funnel, tap the tube on the bench to pack the grains tightly (to increase surface area – air + water rushes through loose Drierite, requiring frequent changes of scrubbers), and cap off with a small amount of cotton. To remove carbon dioxide] before and after the animal chamber, Ascarite II is used (Ascarite II is a registered trademark of the Arthur H. Thomas Co.). Ascarite II contains NaOH, which is caustic (so don't get any on your skin and keep away from water). A scrubbing tube is prepared by placing a small amount of cotton into the tube end, filling one-third of the way with 10–20 mesh Drierite, adding a small amount of cotton, then an additional third of the tube with the Ascarite II, another layer of cotton, followed by more Drierite and capping the tube off with another small amount of cotton. Tap the tube on the bench as each layer is added to pack the grains. Note: Driereite can be used over and over again (after heating in an oven), although indicating Drierite will lose color with repeated drying; Ascarite II is used once and will be considered a hazardous waste.

Analyzers

- Carbon dioxide analyzer: CO_{2} analyzers typically use infrared-based detection methods to take advantage of the fact that CO_{2} will absorb infra-red light and re-emit light at slightly longer wavelengths. The panel meter on the analyzer displays over the entire 0.01 – 10% CO_{2} range and a voltage output proportional to CO_{2} concentration is also generated for data recording.
- Oxygen analyzer: Oxygen analyzers suitable for respirometry use a variety of oxygen sensors, including galvanic ("ambient temperature"), paramagnetic, polarographic (Clark-type electrodes), and zirconium ("high temperature") sensors. Galvanic O_{2} analyzers use a fuel cell containing an acidic electrolyte, a heavy-metal anode and a thin gas-permeable membrane. Since the partial pressure of O_{2} near the anode is zero, O_{2} is driven by diffusion to the anode via the membrane at a rate proportional to ambient O_{2} partial pressure. The fuel cell produces a voltage linearly proportional to the O_{2} partial pressure at the membrane. As long as cabinet temperature is stable, and provided that air flow across the fuel cell is stable and within range, the response will be 0.01% or better depending on supporting electronics, software, and other considerations.

Finally, a computer data acquisition and control system would be a typical addition to complete the system. Instead of a chart recorder, continuous records of oxygen consumption and or carbon dioxide production are made with the assistance of an analog-to-digital converter coupled to a computer. Software captures, filters, converts, and displays the signal as appropriate to the experimenter's needs. A variety of companies and individuals service the respirometry community (e.g., Sable Systems, Qubit Systems, see also Warthog Systems).

== Mitochondrial metabolic rates ==
Inside the body oxygen is delivered to cells and in the cells to mitochondria, where it is consumed in the process generating most of the energy required by the organism. Mitochondrial respirometry measures the consumption of oxygen by the mitochondria without involving an entire living animal and is the main tool to study mitochondrial function. Three different types of samples may be subjected to such respirometric studies: isolated mitochondria (from cell cultures, animals or plants); permeabilized cells (from cell cultures); and permeabilized fibers or tissues (from animals). In the latter two cases the cellular membrane is made permeable by the addition of chemicals leaving selectively the mitochondrial membrane intact. Therefore, chemicals that usually would not be able to cross the cell membrane can directly influence the mitochondria. By the permeabilization of the cellular membrane, the cell stops to exist as a living, defined organism, leaving only the mitochondria as still functional structures. Unlike whole-animal respirometry, mitochondrial respirometry takes place in solution, i.e. the sample is suspended in a medium. Today mitochondrial respirometry is mainly performed with a closed-chamber approach.

=== Closed-chamber system ===
The sample suspended in a suitable medium is placed in a hermetically closed metabolic chamber. The mitochondria are brought into defined "states" by the sequential addition of substrates or inhibitors. Since the mitochondria consume oxygen, the oxygen concentration drops. This change of oxygen concentration is recorded by an oxygen sensor in the chamber. From the rate of the oxygen decline (taking into account correction for oxygen diffusion) the respiratory rate of the mitochondria can be computed.

=== Applications ===
==== Basic research ====
The functioning of mitochondria is studied in the field of bioenergetics. Functional differences between mitochondria from different species are studied by respirometry as an aspect of comparative physiology.

==== Applied research ====
Mitochondrial respirometry is used to study mitochondrial functionality in mitochondrial diseases or diseases with a (suspected) strong link to mitochondria, e.g. diabetes mellitus type 2, obesity and cancer. Other fields of application are e.g. sports science and the connection between mitochondrial function and aging.

=== Equipment ===
The usual equipment includes a seal-able metabolic chamber, an oxygen sensor, and devices for data recording, stirring, thermostatisation and a way to introduce chemicals into the chamber. As described above for whole-animal respirometry the choice of materials is very important. Plastic materials are not suitable for the chamber because of their oxygen storage capacity. When plastic materials are unavoidable (e.g. for o-rings, coatings of stirrers, or stoppers) polymers with a very low oxygen permeability (like PVDF as opposed to e.g. PTFE) may be used. Remaining oxygen diffusion into or out of the chamber materials can be handled by correcting the measured oxygen fluxes for the instrumental oxygen background flux. The entire instrument comprising the mentioned components is often called an oxygraph. The companies providing equipment for whole-animal rspirometry mentioned above are usually not involved in mitochondrial respiromety. The community is serviced at widely varying levels of price and sophistication by companies like Oroboros Instruments, Hansatech, Respirometer Systems & Applications, YSI Life Sciences or Strathkelvin Instruments .

== See also ==
- Basal metabolic rate
- Calorimetry
- Metabolism
- Respirometer
- VO2max
