= Sable Systems =

Manufacturing company

Sable Systems International
- Industry: Manufacturing of scientific instruments
- Founded: 1987
- Founder: Dr. John R. B. Lighton
- Headquarters: North Las Vegas, Nevada, United States
- Area served: Worldwide
- Products: Equipment for respirometry
- Number of employees: 40
- Website: SableSys.com

Sable Systems develops and manufactures equipment for whole animal respirometry and offers courses in respirometry.
