= Resting metabolic rate =

Metabolism in resting mammals

Resting metabolic rate (RMR) refers to whole-body mammal (or other vertebrate) metabolism during a time period of strict and steady resting conditions that are defined by a combination of assumptions of physiological homeostasis and biological equilibrium. RMR differs from basal metabolic rate (BMR) because BMR measurements must meet total physiological equilibrium whereas RMR conditions of measurement can be altered and defined by the contextual limitations. Therefore, BMR is measured in the elusive "perfect" steady state, whereas RMR measurement is more accessible and thus, represents most, if not all measurements or estimates of daily energy expenditure.

Indirect calorimetry is the study or clinical use of the relationship between respirometry and bioenergetics, where measurements of the rates of oxygen consumption (VO_{2}) and the generation of waste products such as carbon dioxide, metabolic water, and less often urea are used to quantify rates of resting energy expenditure. These parameters approximate direct calorimetry measurements of body heat generation to about 98%, and they are the ones most commonly used to represent RMR, expressed as the ratio between i) energy and ii) the time frame of the measurement. For example, following analysis of oxygen consumption of a human subject, if 5.5 kilocalories of energy were estimated during a 5-minute measurement from a rested individual, then the resting metabolic rate equals = 1.1 kcal/min rate. Unlike some related measurements (e.g. METs), RMR itself is not referenced to body mass and has no bearing on the rate of cellular energy metabolism itself.

A comprehensive treatment of confounding factors on BMR measurements is demonstrated as early as 1922 in Massachusetts by Engineering Professor Frank B Sanborn, wherein descriptions of the effects of food, posture, sleep, muscular activity, and emotion provide criteria for separating BMR from RMR.

== Indirect calorimetry ==
=== Pre-computer technologies ===
In the 1780s for the French Academy of Sciences, Lavoisier, Laplace, and Seguin investigated and published relationships between direct calorimetry and respiratory gas exchanges from mammalian subjects. 100 years later in the 19th century for the Connecticut-based Wesleyan University, Professors Atwater and Rosa provided ample evidence of nitrogen, carbon dioxide, and oxygen transport during the metabolism of amino acids, glucose, and fatty acids in human subjects, further establishing the value of indirect calorimetry in determining bioenergetics of free-living humans. The work of Atwater and Rosa also made it possible to calculate the caloric values of foods, which eventually became the criteria adopted by the USDA to create the food calorie library.

In the early 20th century at Oxford University, physiology researcher Claude Gordon Douglas developed an inexpensive and mobile method of collecting exhaled breath (partly in preparation for experiments to be conducted on Pike's Peak, Colorado). In this method, the subject exhales into a nearly impermeable and large volume collection bag over a recorded period of time. The entire volume is measured, the oxygen and carbon dioxide content are analyzed, and the differences from inspired "ambient" air are calculated to determine the rates of oxygen uptake and carbon dioxide output.

To estimate energy expenditure from the exhaled gases, several algorithms were developed. One of the most widely used was developed in 1949 at University of Glasgow by research physiologist J. B. de V. Weir. His abbreviated equation for estimating metabolic rate was written with rates of gas exchange being volume/time, excluded urinary nitrogen, and allowed for the inclusion of a time conversion factor of 1.44 to extrapolate to 24-hour energy expenditure from 'kcal per minute" to "kcal per day." Weir used the Douglas Bag method in his experiments, and in support of neglecting the effect of protein metabolism under normal physiological conditions and eating patterns of ~12.5% protein calories, he wrote:

"...In fact if the percentage of protein calories [consumed] lies between 10 and 14 the maximum error in using [the equation] is less than 1 in 500."

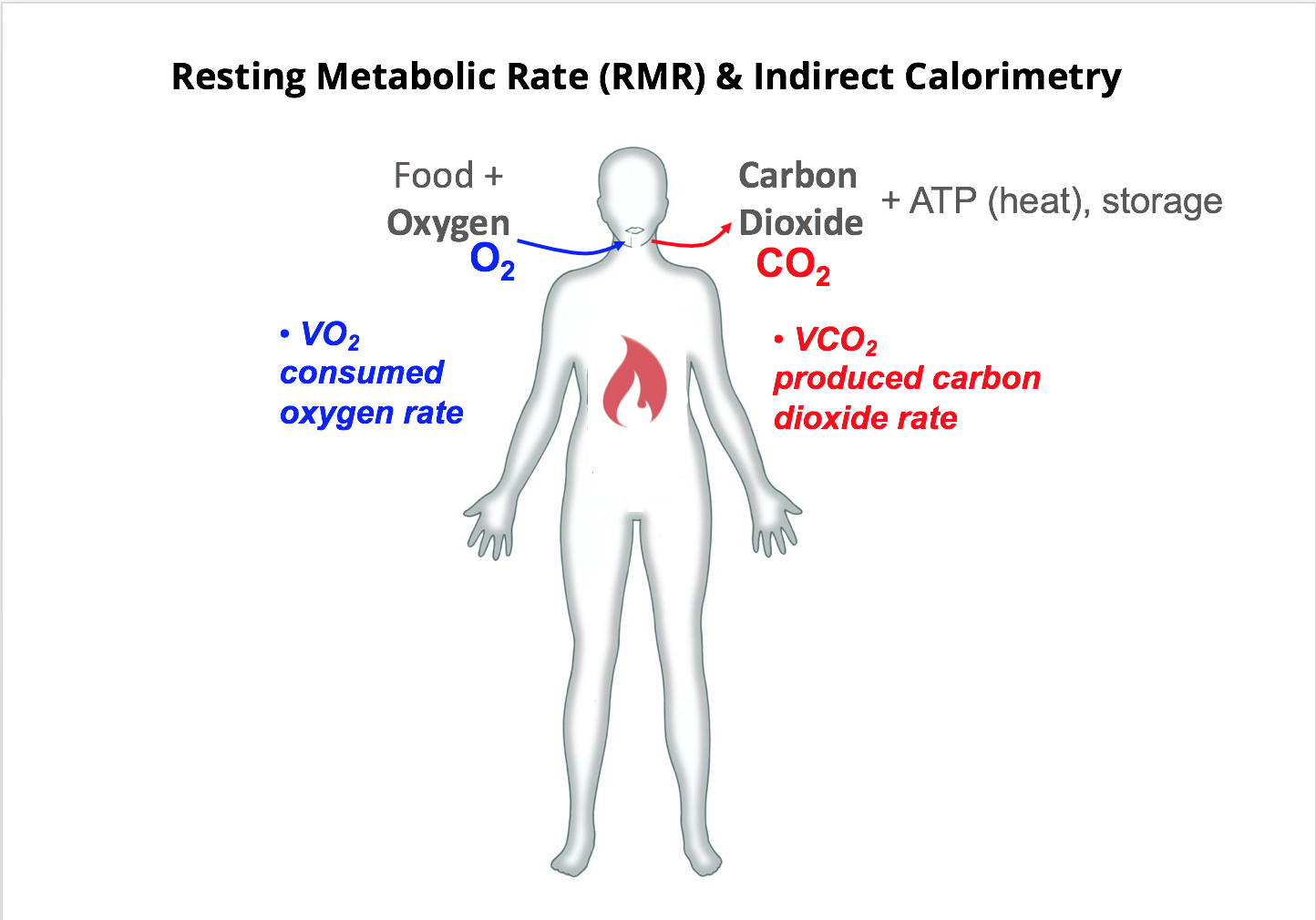
An overview of how oxygen and carbon dioxide relate to human energy expenditure

=== Computer-aided RMR measurements ===
In the early 1970s, computer technology enabled on-site data processing, some real-time analysis, and even graphical displays of metabolic variables, such as O_{2}, CO_{2}, and air-flow, thereby encouraging academic institutions to test accuracy and precision in new ways. A few years later in the decade, battery-operated systems made debuts. For example, a demonstration of the mobile system with digital display of both cumulative and past-minute oxygen consumption was presented in 1977 at the Proceedings of the Physiological Society. As manufacturing and computing costs dropped over the next few decades, various universal calibration methods for preparing and comparing various models in the 1990s brought attention to short-comings or advantages of various designs. In addition to lower costs, the metabolic variable CO_{2} was often ignored, promoting instead a focus on oxygen-consumption models of weight management and exercise training. In the new millennium, smaller "desktop-sized" indirect calorimeters were being distributed with dedicated personal computers and printers, and running modern windows-based software.

== Use ==
RMR measurements are recommended when estimating total daily energy expenditure (TEE). Since BMR measures are restricted to the narrow time frame (and strict conditions) upon waking, the looser-conditions RMR measure is more typically conducted. In the review organized by the USDA, most publications documented specific conditions of resting measurements, including time from latest food intake or physical activities; this comprehensive review estimated RMR is 10 – 20% higher than BMR due to thermic effect of feeding and residual burn from activities that occur throughout the day.

=== Relationship between resting metabolic rate and energy expenditure ===
Thermochemistry aside, the rate of metabolism and an amount of energy expenditures can be mistakenly interchanged, for example, when describing RMR and REE.

=== Clinical guidelines for conditions of resting measurements ===
The Academy of Nutrition and Dietetics (AND) provides clinical guidance for preparing a subject for RMR measures, in order to mitigate possible confounding factors from feeding, stressful physical activities, or exposure to SNS stimulants such as caffeine or nicotine:

In preparation, a subject should be fasting for 7 hrs or greater, and mindful to avoid stimulants and stressors, such as caffeine, nicotine, and hard physical activities such as purposeful exercises.

For 30 minutes before conducting the measurement, a subject should be laying supine without physical movements, no reading nor listening to music. The ambiance should reduce stimulation by maintaining constant quiet, low lighting, and steady temperature. These conditions continue during the measurement stage.

Further, the correct use of a well-maintained indirect calorimeter includes achieving a natural and steady breathing pattern in order to reveal oxygen consumption and carbon dioxide production rates under a reproducible resting condition. Indirect calorimetry is considered the gold-standard method to measure RMR. Indirect calorimeters are usually found in laboratory and clinical settings, but technological advancements are bringing RMR measurement to free-living conditions.

=== Use of REE in weight management ===
Long-term weight management is directly proportional to calories absorbed from feeding, and REE is generally considered to be primarily genetically determined. However, myriad non-caloric factors also play biologically significant roles (not covered here) in estimating energy intake and energy balance. In counting energy expenditure, the use of a resting measurement (RMR) is the most accurate method for estimating what is often the largest portion of total daily energy expenditure (TDEE) in most sedentary individuals, thereby giving the closest approximations when planning and following a calorie intake plan. Thus, estimation of REE by indirect calorimetry is strongly recommended for accomplishing long-term weight management, a conclusion reached and maintained due to ongoing observational research by well-respected institutions such as the USDA, AND (previously ADA), ACSM, and internationally by the WHO.

== Common correlates to metabolic rate and 24-hr energy expenditure ==
Energy expenditure is correlated to a number of factors, listed in alphabetical order.

- Age: Besides the epidemiologically correlated trends of aging, lowered physical activity, and loss of lean muscle mass, lessened cellular energy metabolism (the senescence thereof) may also contribute to a slowing of ATP turnover and lowering of REE.

== Work on non-human species ==
RMR is regularly used in ecology to study the response of individuals to changes in environmental conditions.

Parasites by definition have a negative impact on their hosts and it is thus expected that there might be effects on host RMR. Varying effects of parasite infection on host RMR have been found. Most studies indicate an increase in RMR with parasite infection, but others show no effect, or even a decrease in RMR, perhaps as a protective mechanism to conserve energy and oxygen. It is still unclear why such variation in the direction of change in RMR with parasite infection is seen.
