= Pulmonary alveolus =

Hollow cavity found in the lungs

- The alveoli

Details
- System: Respiratory system
- Location: Lung

Identifiers
- Latin: alveolus pulmonis
- MeSH: D011650
- TH: H3.05.02.0.00026
- FMA: 7318

A pulmonary alveolus (pl. alveoli; from Latin alveolus 'little cavity'), also called an air sac or air space, is one of millions of hollow, distensible cup-shaped cavities in the lungs where pulmonary gas exchange takes place. Oxygen is exchanged for carbon dioxide at the blood–air barrier between the alveolar air and the pulmonary capillary. Alveoli make up the functional tissue of the mammalian lungs known as the lung parenchyma, which takes up 90 percent of the total lung volume.

Alveoli are first located in the respiratory bronchioles that mark the beginning of the respiratory zone. They are located sparsely in these bronchioles, line the walls of the alveolar ducts, and are more numerous in the blind-ended alveolar sacs. The acini are the basic units of respiration, with gas exchange taking place in all the alveoli present. The alveolar membrane is the gas exchange surface, surrounded by a network of capillaries. Oxygen is diffused across the membrane into the capillaries and carbon dioxide is released from the capillaries into the alveoli to be breathed out.

Alveoli are particular to mammalian lungs. Different structures are involved in gas exchange in other vertebrates.

== Structure ==
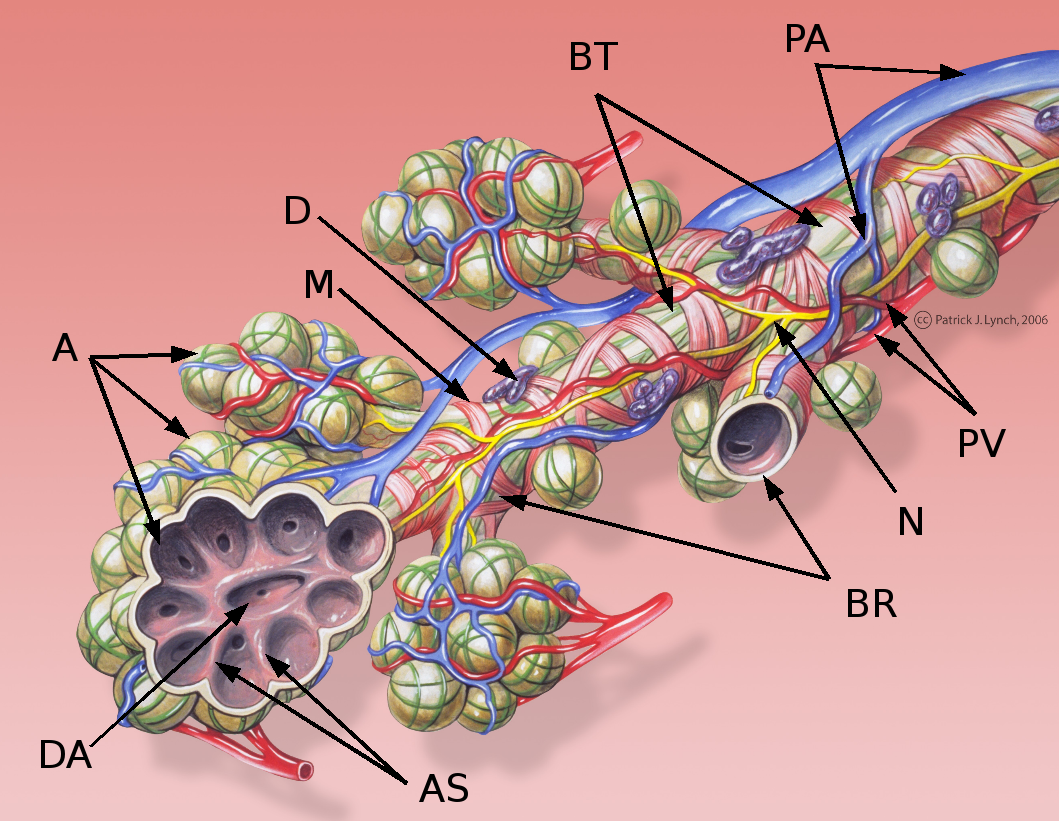
Bronchial anatomy showing terminal bronchioles (BT) leading to respiratory bronchioles (BR) and alveolar ducts (DA) that open into alveolar sacs containing out pockets of alveoli (A) separated by alveolar septa (AS)

The alveoli are first located in the respiratory bronchioles as scattered outpockets, extending from their lumens. The respiratory bronchioles run for considerable lengths and become increasingly alveolated with side branches of alveolar ducts that become deeply lined with alveoli. The ducts number between two and eleven from each bronchiole. Each duct opens into five or six alveolar sacs into which clusters of alveoli open.

Each terminal respiratory unit is called an acinus and consists of the respiratory bronchioles, alveolar ducts, alveolar sacs, and alveoli. New alveoli continue to form until the age of eight years.

A typical pair of human lungs contains about 480 million alveoli, providing a total surface area for gas exchange of between 70 and 80 square metres. Each alveolus is wrapped in a fine mesh of capillaries covering about 70% of its area. The diameter of an alveolus is between 200 and 500 μm.

=== Microanatomy ===
An alveolus consists of an epithelial layer of simple squamous epithelium (very thin, flattened cells), and an extracellular matrix surrounded by capillaries. The epithelial lining is part of the alveolar membrane, also known as the respiratory membrane, that allows the exchange of gases. The membrane has several layers – a layer of alveolar lining fluid that contains surfactant, the epithelial lining layer and its basement membrane. The capillary endothelial basement membrane fuses with the basement membrane of the alveolar epithelium forming the alveolar basement membrane. The whole membrane however is only between 0.2 μm at its thinnest part and 0.6 μm at its thickest.

In the alveolar walls there are interconnecting air passages between the alveoli known as the pores of Kohn. The alveolar septum that separates the alveoli in the alveolar sac contains some collagen fibers and elastic fibers. The septa also house the enmeshed capillary network that surrounds each alveolus. The elastic fibres allow the alveoli to stretch when they fill with air during inhalation. They then spring back during exhalation in order to expel the carbon dioxide-rich air.

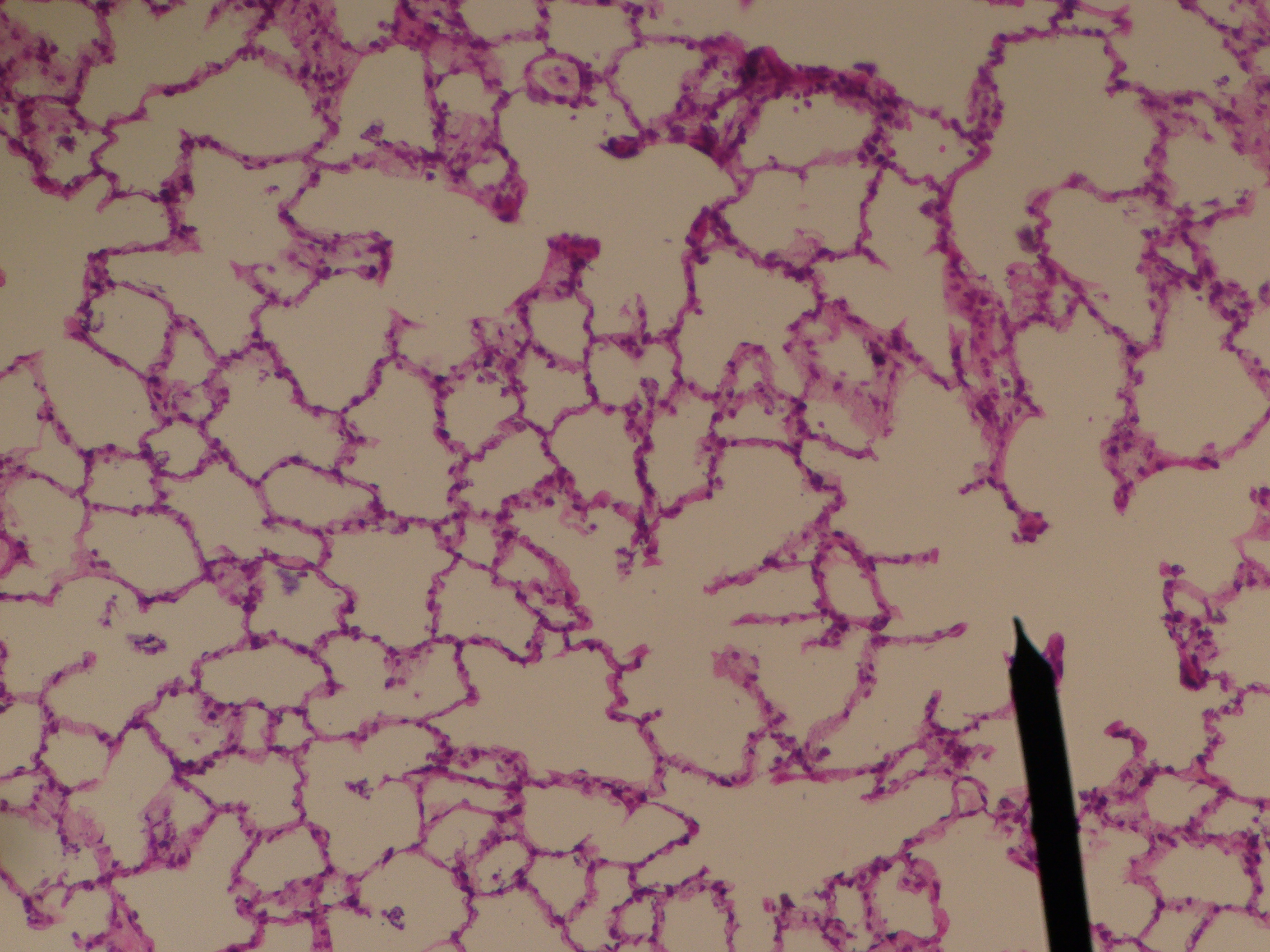
A histologic slide of a human alveolar sac

There are three major types of alveolar cell. Two types are pneumocytes or pneumonocytes known as type I and type II cells found in the alveolar wall, and a large phagocytic cell known as an alveolar macrophage that moves about in the lumens of the alveoli, and in the connective tissue between them. Type I cells, also called type I pneumocytes, or type I alveolar cells, are squamous, thin and flat and form the structure of the alveoli. Type II cells, also called type II pneumocytes or type II alveolar cells, release pulmonary surfactant to lower surface tension, and can also differentiate to replace damaged type I cells.

== Development ==
Development of the earliest structures that will contain alveoli begins on day 22 and is divided into five stages: embryonic, pseudoglandular, canalicular, saccular, and alveolar stage. The alveolar stage begins approximately 36 weeks into development. Immature alveoli appear as bulges from the sacculi which invade the primary septa. As the sacculi develop, the protrusions in the primary septa become larger; new septations are longer and thinner and are known as secondary septa. Secondary septa are responsible for the final division of the sacculi into alveoli. Majority of alveolar division occurs within the first 6 months but continue to develop until 3 years of age. To create a thinner diffusion barrier, the double-layer capillary network fuse into one network, each one closely associated with two alveoli as they develop.

In the first three years of life, the enlargement of lungs is a consequence of the increasing number of alveoli; after this point, both the number and size of alveoli increases until the development of lungs finishes at approximately 8 years of age.

== Function ==
An annotated diagram of the alveolus

=== Type I cells ===
The cross section of an alveolus with capillaries is shown. Part of the cross section is magnified to show diffusion of oxygen gas and carbon dioxide through type I cells and capillary cells.

Gas exchange in the alveolus

Type I cells are the larger of the two cell types; they are thin, flat epithelial lining cells (membranous pneumocytes), that form the structure of the alveoli. They are squamous (giving more surface area to each cell) and have long cytoplasmic extensions that cover more than 95% of the alveolar surface. A thin lining of epithelium covers the alveoli, aiding the diffusion of gas exchange between the air in the alveoli and the blood in the surrounding capillaries.

Type I cells are extremely thin, sometimes being only 25 nm thick; as visible light has a wavelength in hundreds of nanometres, electron microscopy is required to observe these cells.

The nucleus of a type I cell occupies a large area of free cytoplasm and its organelles are clustered around it reducing the thickness of the cell. This also keeps the thickness of the blood-air barrier reduced to a minimum.

The cytoplasm in the thin portion contains pinocytotic vesicles which may play a role in the removal of small particulate contaminants from the outer surface. In addition to desmosomes, all type I alveolar cells have occluding junctions that prevent the leakage of tissue fluid into the alveolar air space.

The relatively low solubility (and hence rate of diffusion) of oxygen necessitates the large internal surface area (about 80 square m [96 square yards]) and very thin walls of the alveoli. Weaving between the capillaries and helping to support them is an extracellular matrix, a meshlike fabric of elastic and collagenous fibres. The collagen fibres, being more rigid, give the wall firmness, while the elastic fibres permit expansion and contraction of the walls during breathing.

Type I pneumocytes are unable to replicate and are susceptible to toxic insults. In the event of damage, type II cells can proliferate and differentiate into type I cells to compensate.

=== Type II cells ===
Type II cells are cuboidal and much smaller than type I cells. They are the most numerous cells in the alveoli, yet do not cover as much surface area as the squamous type I cells. Type II cells (granulous pneumocytes) in the alveolar wall contain secretory organelles known as lamellar bodies or lamellar granules, that fuse with the cell membranes and secrete pulmonary surfactant. This surfactant is a film of fatty substances, a group of phospholipids that reduce alveolar surface tension. The phospholipids are stored in the lamellar bodies. Without this coating, the alveoli would collapse. The surfactant is continuously released by exocytosis. Reinflation of the alveoli following exhalation is made easier by the surfactant, which reduces surface tension in the thin fluid lining of the alveoli. The fluid coating is produced by the body in order to facilitate the transfer of gases between blood and alveolar air, and the type II cells are typically found at the blood–air barrier.

Type II cells start to develop at about 26 weeks of gestation, secreting small amounts of surfactant. However, adequate amounts of surfactant are not secreted until about 35 weeks of gestation – this is the main reason for increased rates of infant respiratory distress syndrome, which drastically reduces at ages above 35 weeks gestation.

Type II cells are also capable of cellular division, giving rise to more type I and II alveolar cells when the lung tissue is damaged.

MUC1, a human gene associated with type II pneumocytes, has been identified as a marker in lung cancer.

The importance of the type 2 lung alveolar cells in the development of severe respiratory symptoms of COVID-19 and potential mechanisms on how these cells are protected by the SSRIs fluvoxamine and fluoxetine was summarized in a review in April 2022.

=== Alveolar macrophages ===
The alveolar macrophages reside on the internal luminal surfaces of the alveoli, the alveolar ducts, and the bronchioles. They are mobile scavengers that serve to engulf foreign particles in the lungs, such as dust, bacteria, carbon particles, and blood cells from injuries. They are also called pulmonary macrophages, and dust cells. Alveolar macrophages also play a crucial role in immune responses against viral pathogens in the lungs. They secrete cytokines and chemokines, which recruit and activate other immune cells, initiate type I interferon signaling, and inhibit the nuclear export of viral genomes.

== Clinical significance ==
=== Diseases ===
==== Surfactant ====
Insufficient surfactant in the alveoli is one of the causes that can contribute to atelectasis (collapse of part or all of the lung). Without pulmonary surfactant, atelectasis is a certainty. The severe condition of acute respiratory distress syndrome (ARDS) is caused by a deficiency or dysfunction of surfactant. Insufficient surfactant in the lungs of preterm infants causes infant respiratory distress syndrome (IRDS). The lecithin–sphingomyelin ratio is a measure of fetal amniotic fluid to indicate lung maturity or immaturity. A low ratio indicates a risk factor for IRDS. Lecithin and sphingomyelin are two of the glycolipids of pulmonary surfactant.

Impaired surfactant regulation can cause an accumulation of surfactant proteins to build up in the alveoli in a condition called pulmonary alveolar proteinosis. This results in impaired gas exchange.

==== Inflammation ====
Pneumonia is an inflammatory condition of the lung tissue, which can be caused by both viruses and bacteria. Cytokines and fluids are released into the alveolar cavity, interstitium, or both, in response to infection, causing the effective surface area of gas exchange to be reduced. In severe cases where cellular respiration cannot be maintained, supplemental oxygen may be required.

- Diffuse alveolar damage can be a cause of acute respiratory distress syndrome(ARDS) a severe inflammatory disease of the lung.
- In asthma, the bronchioles become narrowed, causing the amount of air flow into the lung tissue to be greatly reduced. It can be triggered by irritants in the air, photochemical smog for example, as well as substances to which a person is allergic.
- Chronic bronchitis occurs when an abundance of mucus is produced by the lungs. The production of mucus occurs naturally when the lung tissue is exposed to irritants. In chronic bronchitis, the air passages into the alveoli, the respiratory bronchioles, become clogged with mucus. This causes increased coughing in order to remove the mucus, and is often a result of extended periods of exposure to cigarette smoke.
- Hypersensitivity pneumonitis

==== Structural ====
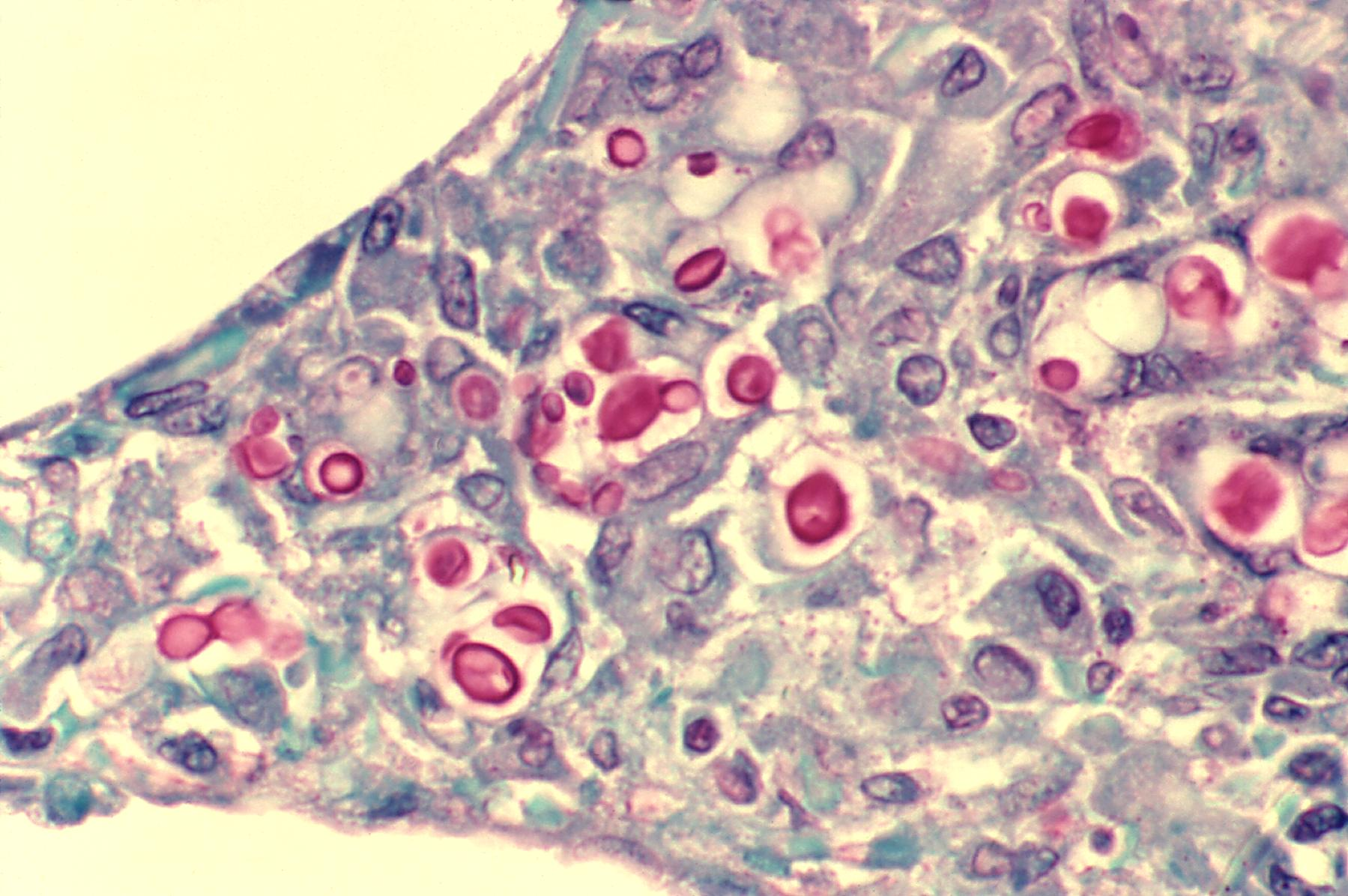
Cryptococcosis of lung in patient with AIDS. Mucicarmine stain. Histopathology of lung shows widened alveolar septum containing a few inflammatory cells and numerous yeasts of Cryptococcus neoformans. The inner layer of the yeast capsule stain red.

Almost any type of lung tumor or lung cancer can compress the alveoli and reduce gas exchange capacity. In some cases the tumor will fill the alveoli.

- Cavitary pneumonia is a process in which the alveoli are destroyed and produce a cavity. As the alveoli are destroyed, the surface area for gas exchange to occur becomes reduced. Further changes in blood flow can lead to decline in lung function.
- Emphysema is another disease of the lungs, whereby the elastin in the walls of the alveoli is broken down by an imbalance between the production of neutrophil elastase (elevated by cigarette smoke) and alpha-1 antitrypsin (the activity varies due to genetics or reaction of a critical methionine residue with toxins including cigarette smoke). The resulting loss of elasticity in the lungs leads to prolonged times for exhalation, which occurs through passive recoil of the expanded lung. This leads to a smaller volume of gas exchanged per breath.
- Pulmonary alveolar microlithiasis is a rare lung disorder of small stone formation in the alveoli.
- Several factors, including smoking, viral infections, and aging, contribute to physical damage to type II alveolar cells. Some studies have linked injury to these cells to the proliferation of fibrosis in the lungs and the onset of idiopathic pulmonary fibrosis.

==== Fluid ====
A pulmonary contusion is a bruise of the lung tissue caused by trauma. Damaged capillaries from a contusion can cause blood and other fluids to accumulate in the tissue of the lung, impairing gas exchange.

Pulmonary edema is the buildup of fluid in the parenchyma and alveoli. An edema is usually caused by left ventricular heart failure, or by damage to the lung or its vasculature.

==== Coronavirus ====
Because of the high expression of angiotensin-converting enzyme 2 (ACE2) in type II alveolar cells, the lungs are susceptible to infections by some coronaviruses including the viruses that cause severe acute respiratory syndrome (SARS) and coronavirus disease 2019 (COVID-19).

== Additional images ==
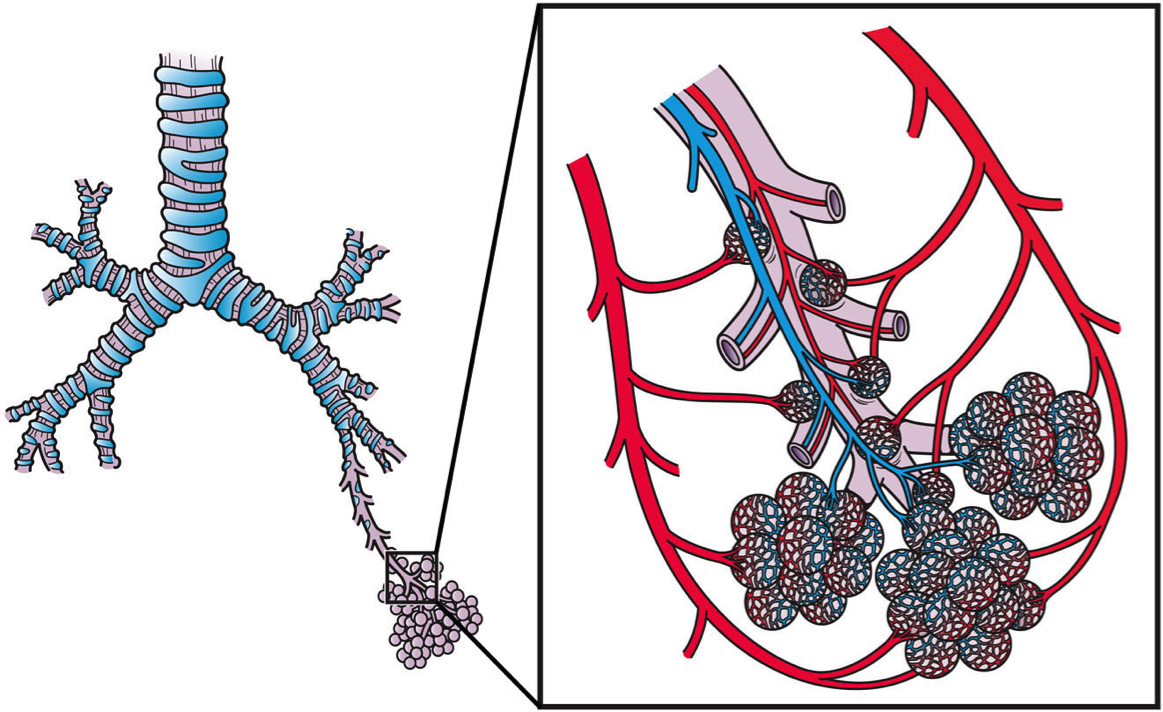
Blood circulation around alveoli

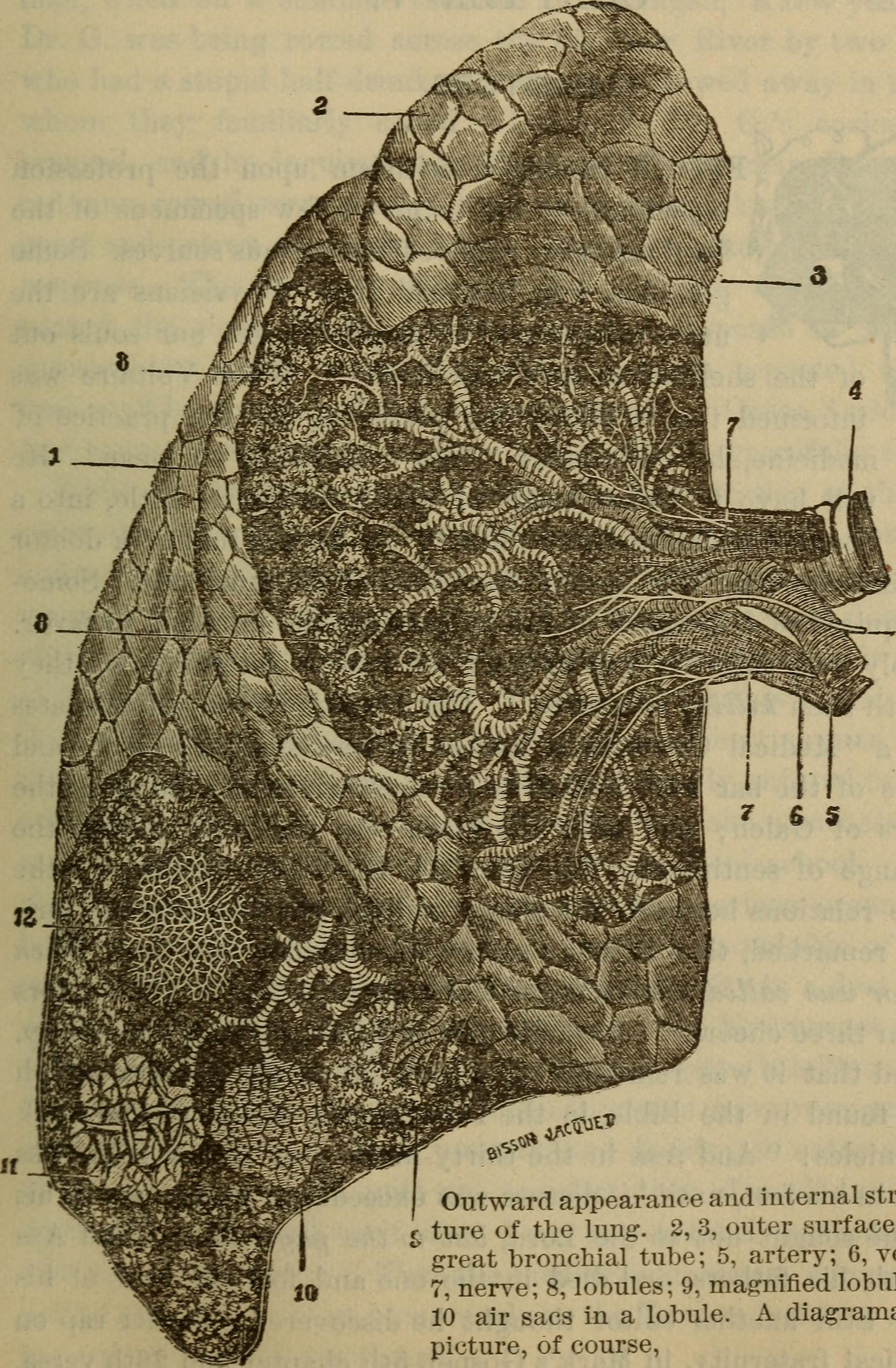
Diagrammatic view of lung showing magnified inner structures including alveolar sacs at 10) and lobules at 9)

== See also ==
- Interstitial lung disease
- A549 cells
- List of distinct cell types in the adult human body
- Physics of Respiration
