= Biru =

Biru may refer to:

- Birú, an archaic variant spelling for Peru (also: Virú, Pelú and Berú)
- biru, a Japanese high-rise or airport terminal, e.g., the Yoyogi Building
- bīru: beer in Japan
- Biru (marketplace), a NFT marketplace on Soneium
- Biru (township), township in Tibet
- Biru County, county in Tibet
- Biru, Ethiopia
