= Sog =

Sog or SOG may refer to:

== People ==
- Andre Ward, US boxer nicknamed S.O.G. (Son Of God)

== Places ==
- Sog, Tibet (also Sogba), Nagqu Prefecture, Tibet Autonomous Region of China
- Sog County, county in Tibet
  - Sogchu River, in Sog County, Tibet
- Sog River, river in Iceland
- SOG, Sogndal Airport, Haukåsen (IATA Airport code)

== Organizations ==
- Society of Genealogists, UK
- Special Operations Group (disambiguation), a police and military unit in the UK and many other places

== Military ==
- Special Operations Group (disambiguation), special forces teams
- Särskilda operationsgruppen, a special forces regiment, Sweden
- Military Assistance Command, Vietnam – Studies and Observations Group (MACV-SOG or SOG), clandestine US special operations group 1964–1972
  - SOG Knife, used by U.S. armed forces
  - SOG Specialty Knives, US manufacturer
- Spear Operations Group, an American private military company responsible for assassinations in the Yemeni Civil War

== Science and technology ==
- Speed over ground, a nautical term
- Stool osmotic gap, a medical test value
- Sync-on-green, a method of sending component video sync signals to video displays
