= Jiangda, Nagqu =

Jiangda
- Township
- Location in the Tibet Autonomous Region
- Coordinates: 31°29′3″N 94°23′26″E
- Country: People's Republic of China
- Autonomous region: Tibet
- Prefecture-level city: Nagqu
- County: Sog

Population (2010)
  - Total: 3,155
- Time zone: UTC+8 (China Standard)

Jiangda, also Jamda or Jagda (Chinese: 江达乡) is a township of Sog County in the Nagqu Prefecture of the Tibet Autonomous Region of China. It lies on the Nu River, about 170 kilometres (110 mi) by road from Sog. As of 2010 it had a population of 3,155 people.

== History ==
The township was established in 1966, and in 1988 it merged with the former Kedeng Township to form Jiangda Township. In 2007, there were 493 households with 3,087 people. As of 2010 it had a population of 3,155.

== Geography ==
Jiangda lies on the Nu River in the southeastern part of Sog County in the northeast of the Tibet Autonomous Region, about 170 kilometres (110 mi) by road from Sog. The elevation of the township is about 3,700 metres (12,100 ft), with an area rich in forest resources.

== Economy and administration ==
In 2007, the total area under cultivation was 228.39 hectares and there were 14,368 horses. The township has jurisdiction over 11 villages, including Jiangda itself.

== Landmarks ==
There are two temples in the township: Dongzong Temple and Jiangda Temple.
