= Sendagaya =

Sendagaya 千駄ヶ谷
- Area
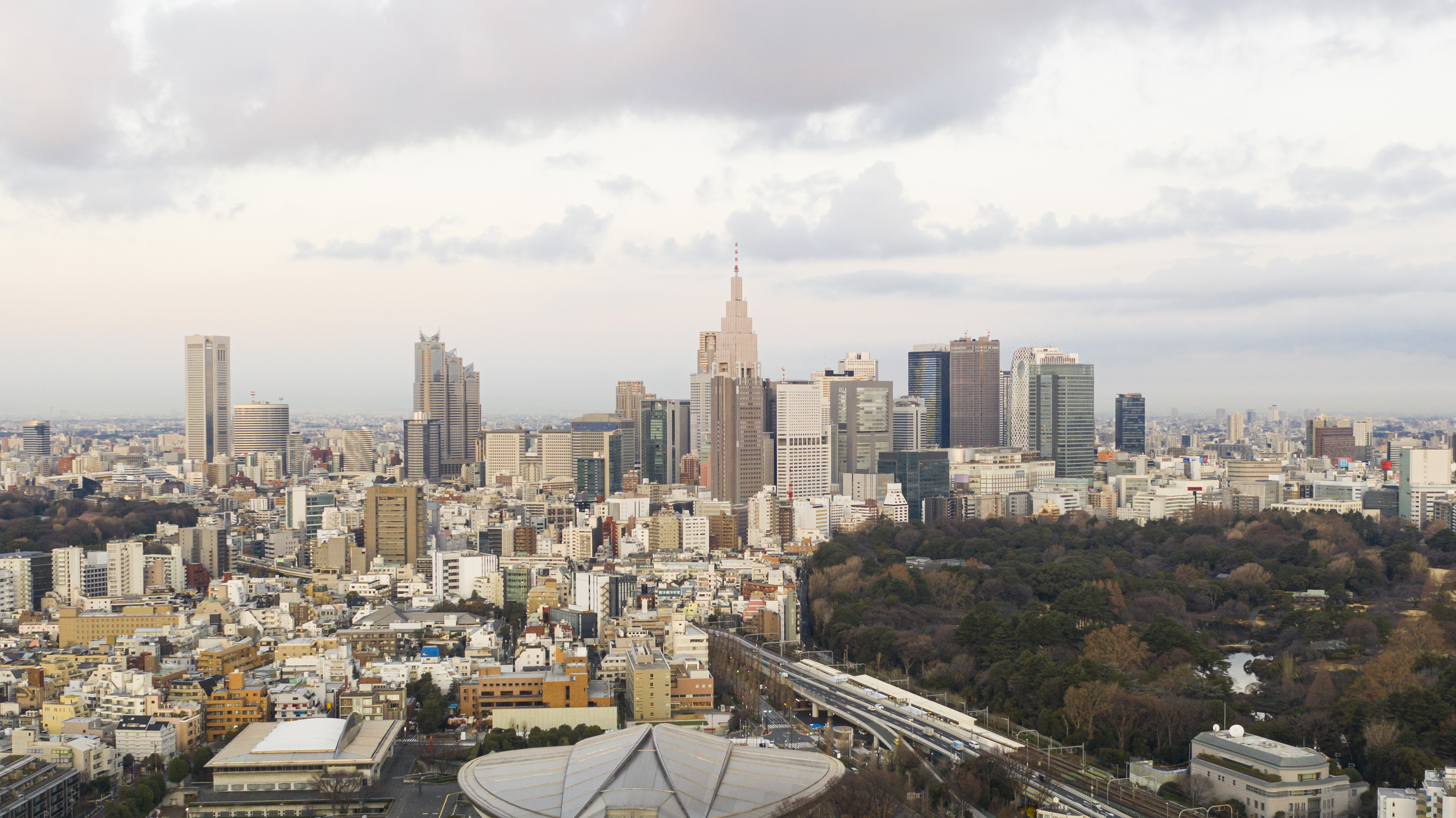
- Aerial view of Sendagaya

- Location in Japan
- Coordinates: 35°40′36″N 139°42′29″E
- Country: Japan
- Region: Tokyo
- District: Shibuya
- Time zone: UTC+09:00 (JST)

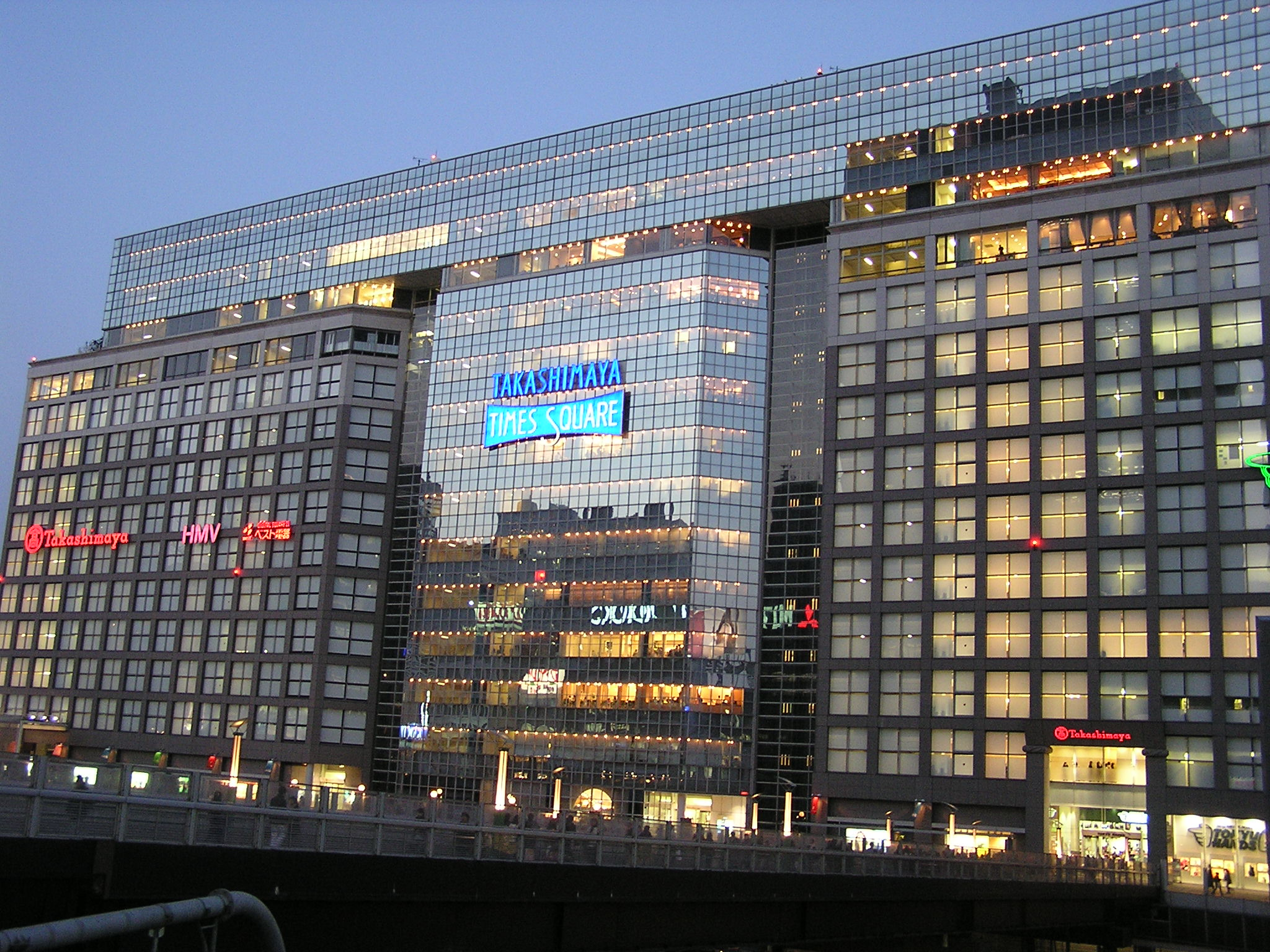
Takashimaya Times Square, Sendagaya 5-chome

Sendagaya (千駄ヶ谷) is an area within Shibuya ward, one of the 23 special wards of Tokyo.

== Introduction ==
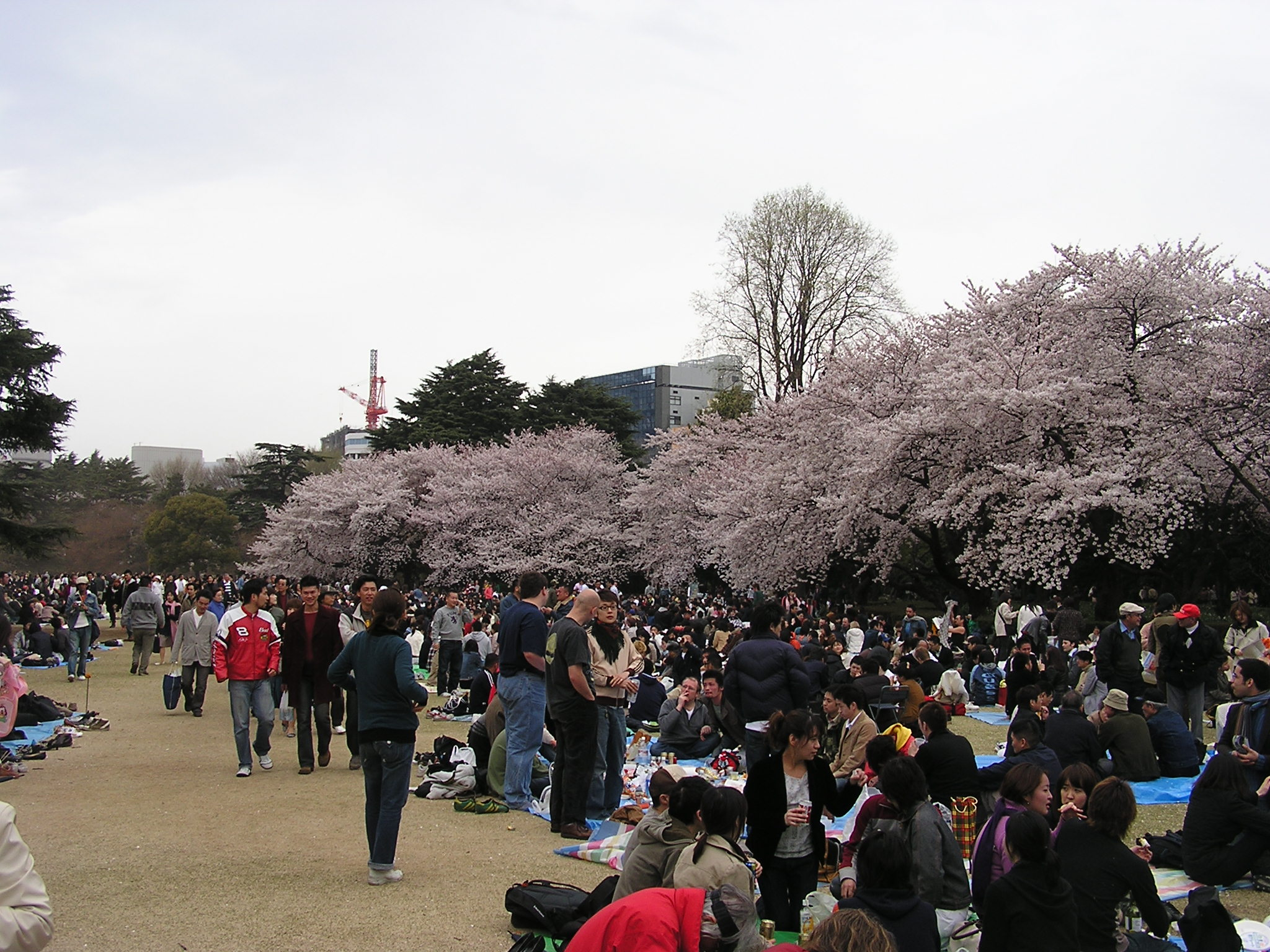
2006 Hanami in Shinjuku Gyoen 2006

Sendagaya is nestled in an urban green area in Shibuya ward between Shinjuku ward and Shinjuku Gyo-en (Shinjuku Imperial Gardens) to the north (an area in Sendagaya, 6-chōme, is actually located within the gardens). The National Stadium, also known as Olympic Stadium, Tokyo is located immediately to the east, bordering Sendagaya 2-chome. Meiji Shrine and Yoyogi Station are found to the west. Jingumae and Harajuku are directly south. Many important cultural and sporting venues are located in and around Sendagaya.

Sendagaya is a mix of old, new, and incredibly futuristic designs. From Sendagaya Station, the main station in Sendagaya, Shinjuku is a 10-minute walk away along the Imperial Gardens' western wall. Sendagaya Entrance to the gardens is 2 minutes away from Sendagaya Station.

Sendagaya, particularly 3-chōme, is home to dozens of clothing and accessory design workshops, studios, offices, and fashion related agencies, including the mega-brand Bape. The narrow streets are filled daily with the hustle and bustle of courier companies picking up next season's designs and delivering the finished product.

== Theatres ==
Sendagaya includes several theaters and organizations related to the arts, such as the National Noh Theatre, designed by Hiroshi Oe and completed in 1983. Also, the Kinokuniya Southern Theater, the classical music Tsuda Hall (津田ホール), the Japan Federation of Composers, the Japan Theatre Arts Association, the Japan Association of Music Enterprises, the Tokyo Nikikai Opera Foundation, a troupe of opera singers dedicated to promoting and developing the western music movement, and the Japanese Centre of the International Theatre Institute are located in Sendagaya.

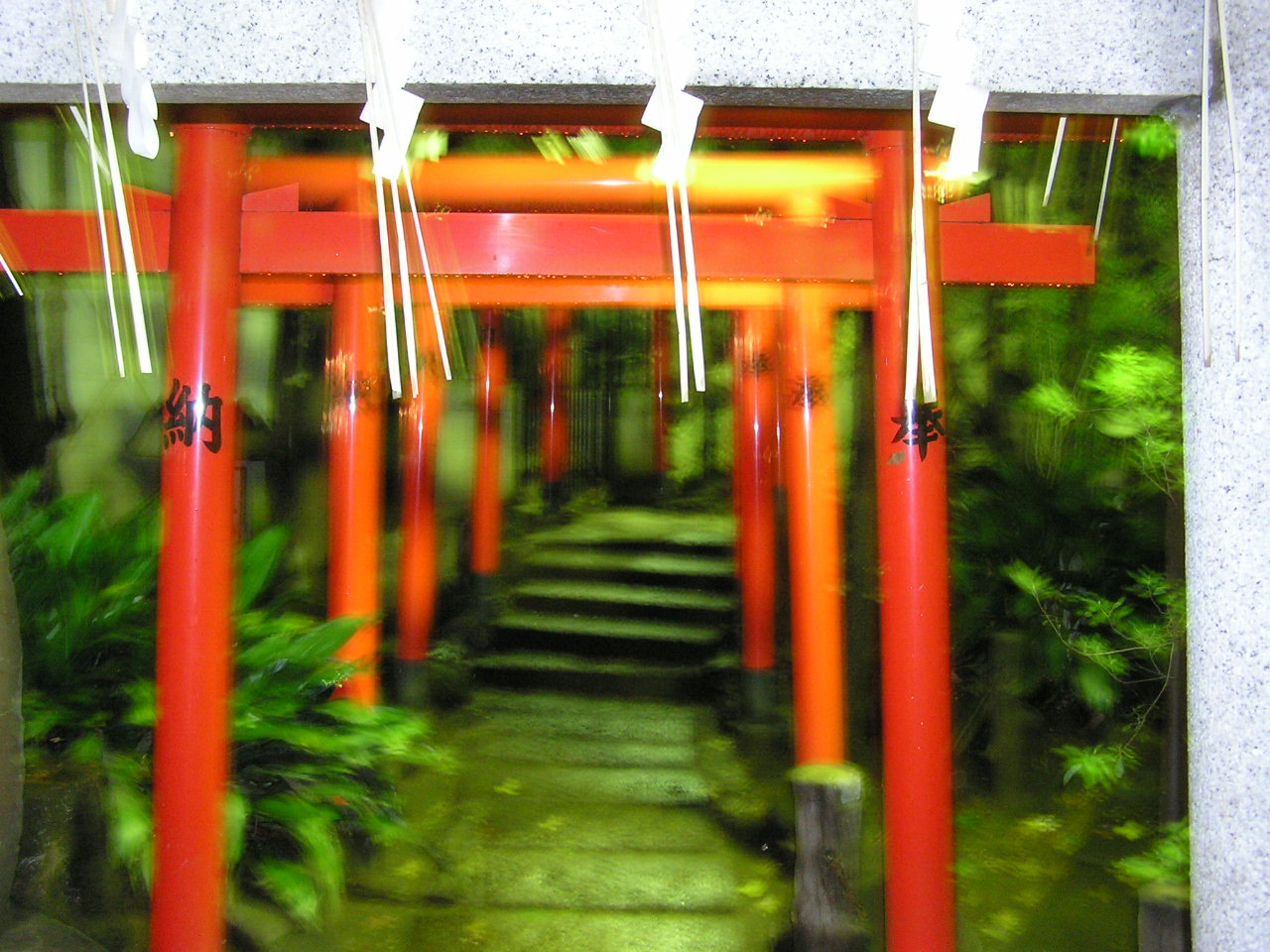
Torii Gates in Hato no Mori Hachiman Shrine

== Shrines ==
A few minutes walk from the station, is the Hato no Mori Hachiman Shrine (鳩森八幡神社, Hato no mori hachiman jinja), an oasis of calm with its 300-year-old pine trees. This small shrine is a place of historical importance in Shibuya. Within the shrine, there is a stage for Japanese performing arts and a fujizuka, a replica of Mount Fuji made from stones carried from Mt. Fuji. Fujitsuka were common in Japan during the Edo period and were constructed to allow people to make a symbolic pilgrimage to the sacred Mt. Fuji when travel between domains (han) was not permitted for commoners under most circumstances. This fujitsuka is one of the few that survive in Tokyo.

== Sports ==
A number of sports' complex are found nearby Sendgaya Station including the Olympic Stadium, Tokyo (which actually sits in Shinjuku-ku) built for the 1958 Asian Games and subsequently used for the 1964 Summer Olympics. Near the stadium, are other important venues, such as Meiji Jingu Skate and Curling Rink and Futsal Courts, the Meiji Jingu Stadium used by the Yakult Swallows baseball team, Jingu Secondary Stadium, Chichibunomiya Rugby Stadium, and the Tokyo Metropolitan Gymnasium (東京体育館).

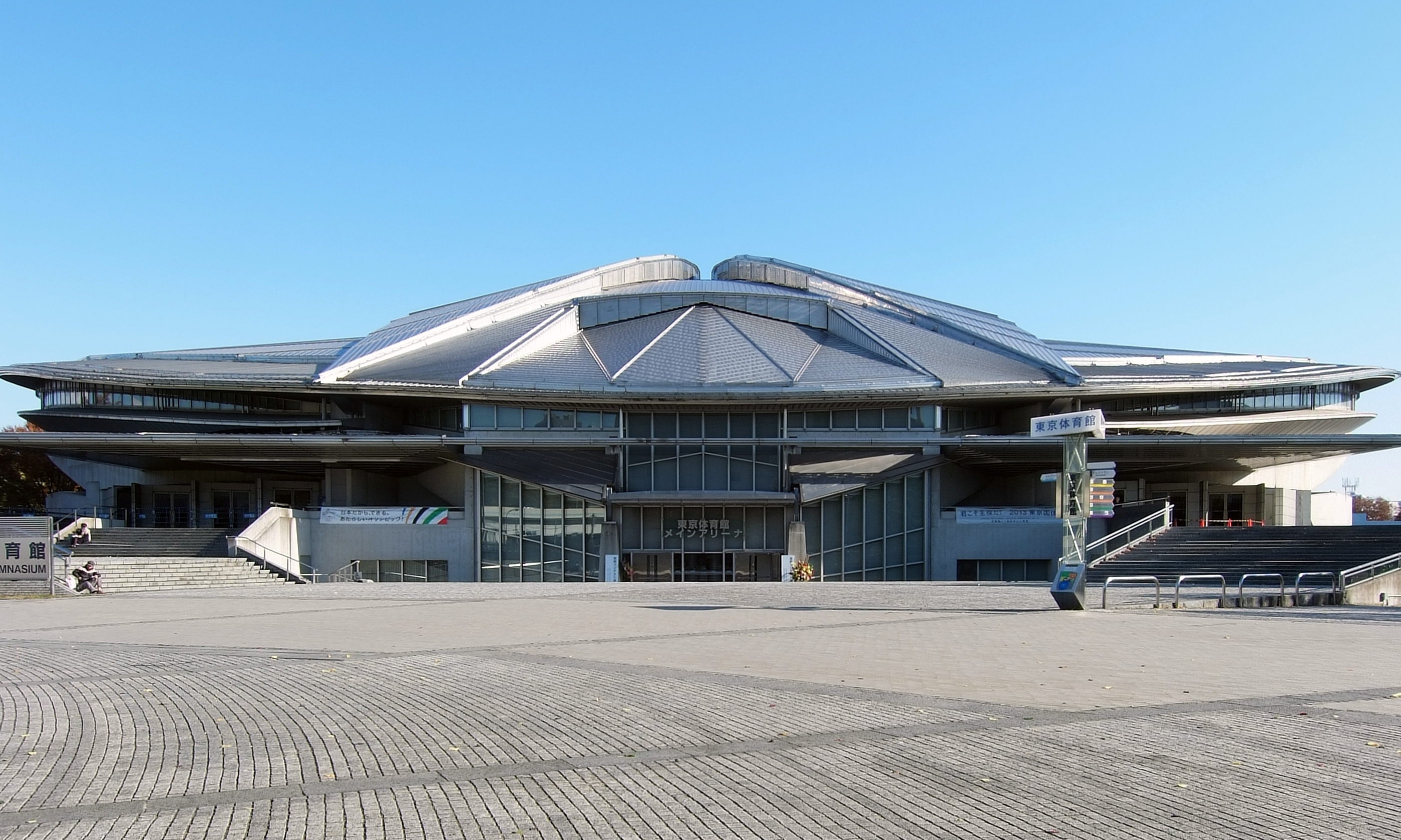
Sunny day at Tokyo Metropolitan Gymnasium

Modern Japanese architecture is on display directly in front of Sendagaya Station at the metro gymnasium, which houses an Olympic size swimming pool, as well as a shorter 25m pool; an outdoor oval running track; a weight training room; and large indoor arena (photo opposite). The futuristic designed main arena, half built below ground, which seems to hover over the surrounding area, is used for a number of national and international sporting events, including the WTA Toray Pan Pacific Tennis Championships. The Tokyo Metropolitan Gymnasium, built in 1991, was designed by Japanese architect and Pritzker Prize winner Fumihiko Maki.

== Embassies ==
- Embassy of the Congo, Democratic Republic of (Sendagaya 3-chome)
- Embassy of the Kingdom of Morocco (2-chome)

== Education ==
Shibuya Board of Education operates public elementary and junior high schools.

Sendagaya 2-3 chōme and 1-chōme 1, and 11-12 ban are zoned to Sendagaya Elementary School (千駄谷小学校). Sendagaya 4-6 chōme, and 1-chōme 2-10 and 13-36 ban are zoned to Hatomori Elementary School (鳩森小学校). All of Sendagaya is zoned to Harajuku Gaien Junior High School (原宿外苑中学校).

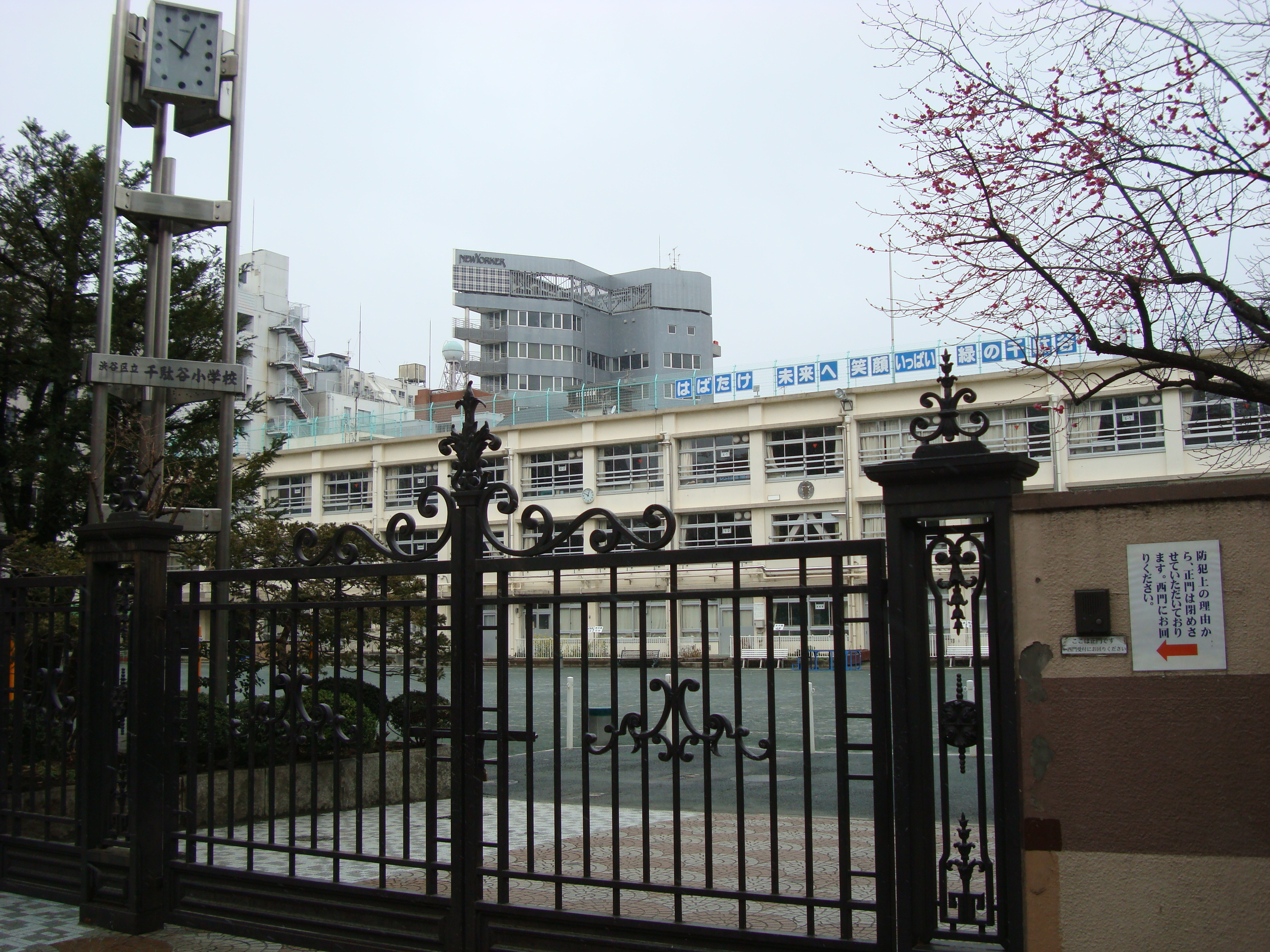
Sendagaya Elementary School (千駄谷小学校)

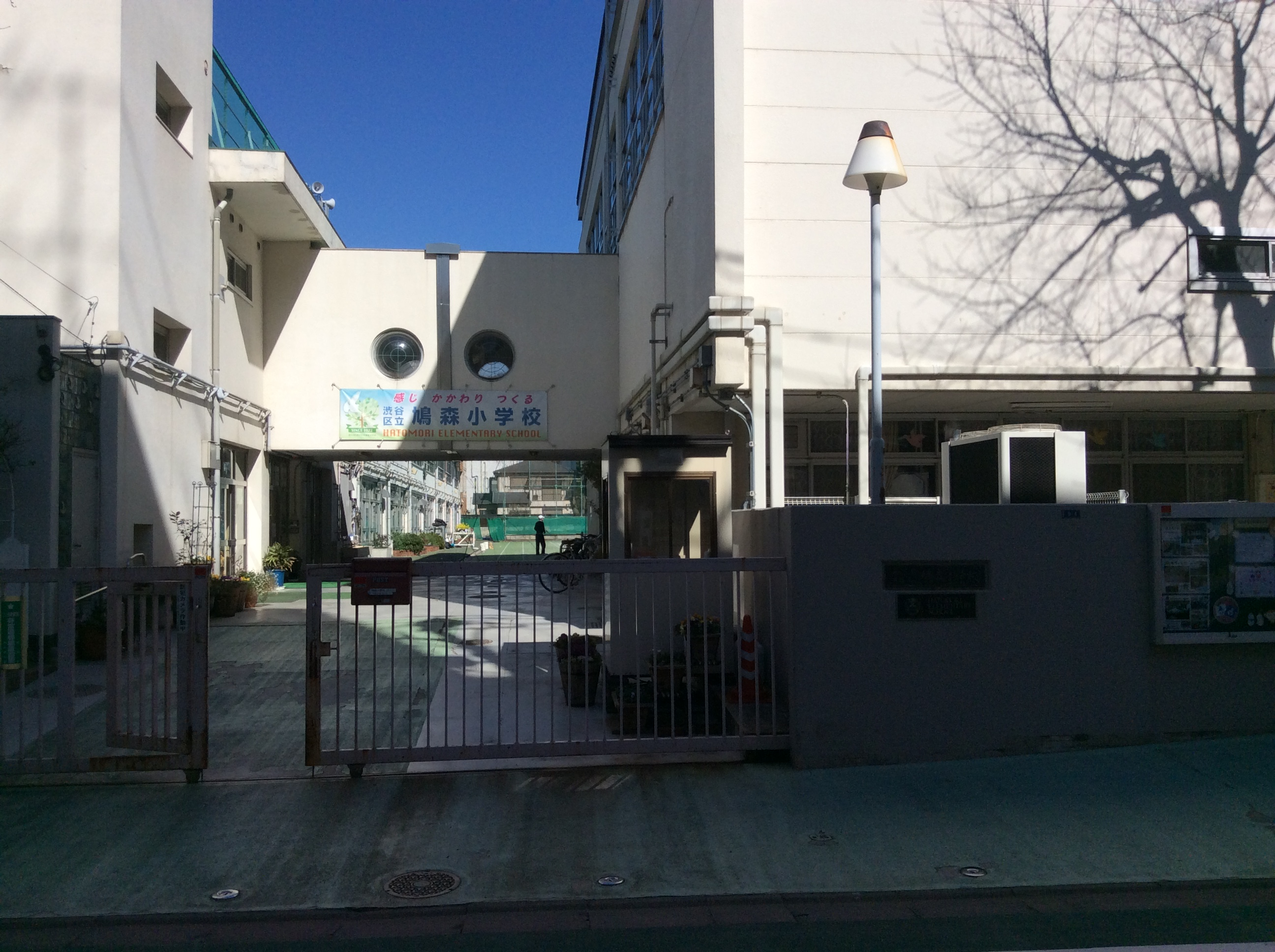
Hatomori Elementary School (鳩森小学校)

Post-secondary schools in Sendagaya:

- Tokyo Design Academy (東京デザイン専門学校) (Sendagaya 3-chome)
- Nippon Design College (日本デザイン専門学校) (Sendagaya 5-chome)
- Tsuda School of Business (津田スクールオヴビズネス) (Sendagaya 1-chome)

== Business and other ventures ==
Japanese Communist Party Central Committee, Sendagaya 4-chome, with Sobu Line train crossing above Meiji Dori

- NTT DoCoMo Yoyogi Building (Sendagaya 5-chome)
- Takashimya Times Square, located at the southern exit of Shinjuku Station (Sendagaya 5-chome)
- Kinokuniya Book Store (Sendagaya 5-chome)
- Shinjuku Southern Terrace-Opposite Takashimaya Times Square
- Japanese Communist Party Central Committee Headquarters (Sendagaya 4-chome)
- Gap Japan Head Office (Sendagaya 5-chome)
- Japan Shogi Association's headquarters

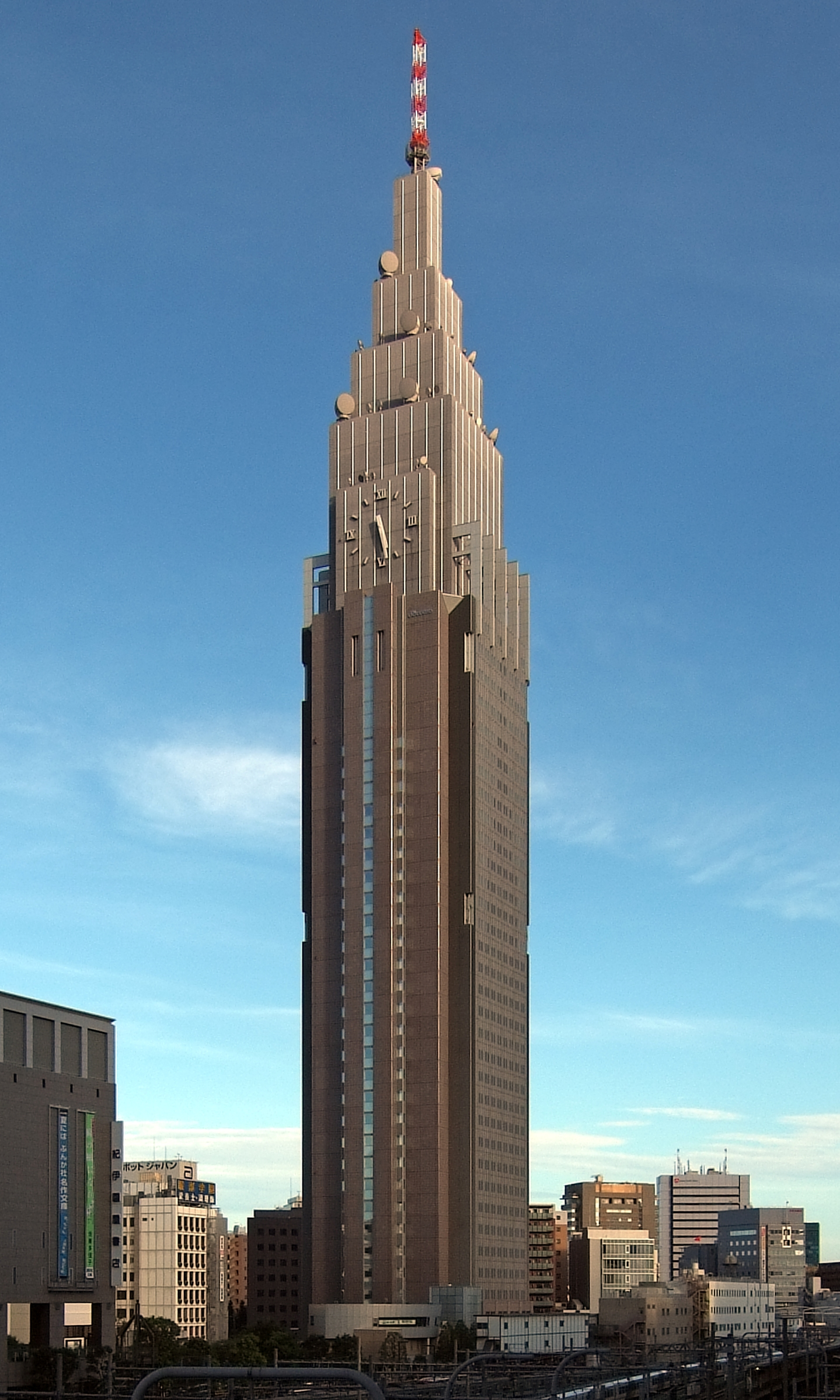
NTT DoCoMo Yoyogi Building

== Transportation ==
=== Rail and Subway Stations ===
JR Sendagaya Station on the Chūō-Sōbu Line (中央総武線) is the neighborhood's main station. Yoyogi Station (JR Yamanote Line (山手線) and Chūō-Sobu) and Shinanomachi Station (信濃町駅)are the JR Chūō-Sobu Line stations on either side of Sendagaya.

The southern half of Shinjuku Station, the world's busiest station, is also located in Sendagaya.

Kokuritsu-Kyōgijō Station (E-25), on the Toei Ōedo Line (都営大江戸線), sits in front of Sendagaya Station.

Kitasandō Station (北参道駅), nearby on Meiji Dōri (明治道り), on the new Fukutoshin Line (副都心線), is run by the Tokyo Metro.

A little further on foot are the stations of Gaienmae (外苑前) in Minato-ku (港区) on the Ginza Line (銀座線), Omotesandō on the Ginza Line, Chiyoda Line (千代田線) and Hanzōmon Line (半蔵門線) and Meiji Jingu (明治神宮) on the (Chiyoda Line).

Also, JR Harajuku on the Yamanote Line can be found nearby.

The Royal Platform (宮廷ホーム), used by the Japanese Imperial Family during special occasions, is located along the Yamanote Line in Sendagaya 3-chome.

=== Roads ===
The Shuto Expressway (首都高速道路 Shuto-kōsoku-dōro) passes above Sendagaya running beside the Sobu Line tracks. On/Off ramps for the expressway are in Sendagaya and the neighbouring Shinanomachi area.

Two major urban routes – Meiji Avenue (明治通り (Rt. 305) and Gaien Nishi Avenue (外延西道り) (Rt 418) – run through Sendagaya.
