= Biru, Tibet =

Biru, Tibet may refer to:

- Biru County, county in Tibet
- Biru Town, township in Biru County
