= Osmolal gap =

Osmolal gap can refer to:

- Serum osmolal gap
- Stool osmolal gap
