= ASOG =

ASOG or asog or variation may refer to:

== Places ==
- Asog, Coqên County, Tibet Autonomous Region, People's Republic of China; a village
- Mount Asog, Camarines Sur, Bicol Region, Luzon, Philippines; a volcano

== People ==
- asogs, cross-dressing spiritual leaders from pre-colonial Philippines, see Filipino shamans § Sex and gender and Transgender history § Philippines

== Air Support Operations Group ==
Air Support Operations Groups (ASOGs) are a type of USAF combat support unit

- 1st Air Support Operations Group (1 ASOG)
- 3d Air Support Operations Group (3 ASOG)
- 18th Air Support Operations Group (10 ASOG)
- 368th Expeditionary Air Support Operations Group
- 504th Expeditionary Air Support Operations Group

== Other uses ==
- Asog (film), a 2023 docufiction film by Seán Devlin
- A Shortfall of Gravitas, SpaceX's newest autonomous spaceport drone ship
- Ateneo School of Government (ASoG), a graduate school in the Philippines
- Activity Specific Operating Guidelines (ASOG), see List of abbreviations in oil and gas exploration and production
- ASOG (German: Allgemeine Sicherheits- und Ordnungsgesetz; general safety and regulatory law), the foundational law of the Berlin Police
- ASOG Astronomical Society Of Geelong

== See also ==
- SOG (disambiguation)
- OG (disambiguation)
