= Sepu Kangri =

Mountain in Tibet

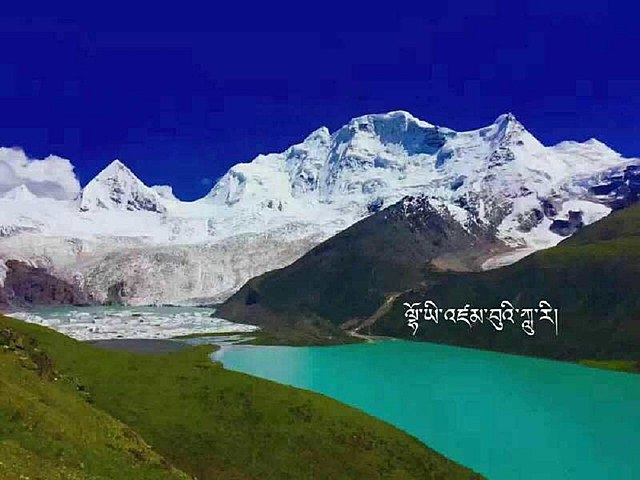

Highest point
- Elevation: 6,956 m (22,822 ft)
- Coordinates: 30°54′15″N 93°47′09″E

Geography
- Location within Tibet
- Country: China
- Autonomous region: Tibet
- Prefecture: Nagqu
- County: Biru County
- Parent range: Nyenchen Tanglha Mountains

Climbing
- First ascent: October 2nd, 2002 by Carlos Buhler and Mark Newcomb

Sepu Kangri
- Traditional Chinese: 色浦崗日
- Simplified Chinese: 色浦岗日
Transcriptions
Standard Mandarin
- Hanyu Pinyin: Sèpǔ gǎngrì

Sapu Mountain
- Traditional Chinese: 萨普神山
- Simplified Chinese: 萨普神山
- Literal meaning: Sapu holy mountain / Sapu sacred mountain
Transcriptions
Standard Mandarin
- Hanyu Pinyin: Sàpǔ shénshān

The Sepu Kangri (Tibetan: བསངས་ཕུ་གངས་རི, Wylie: bsangs phu gangs ri, THL: sang pu gang ri; also Sapu Mountain from Chinese) is a mountain in Biru County, Nagqu prefecture, Tibet Autonomous Region in China. The mountain is 285 kilometres (177 mi) east-northeast of Lhasa and 178 kilometres (111 mi) east-southeast of Nagqu Town. With a height of 6,956 metres (22,822 ft), it forms the highest point in the eastern part of the Nyenchen Tanglha Mountains. The full name of the mountain is Sepu Kunglha Karpo, meaning "white snow god".

The mountain is sacred in Tibetan Bon tradition. The mountain is referred to as (Tibetan: ལྷོ་ཡི་འཛམ་བུ་ཀླུ་རི, Wylie: lho yi 'dzam bu klu ri) in that context. There is a Bon monastery that is more than half millennium old in the valley below.

== Climbing history ==
Chris Bonington and Charles Clarke explored the mountain in 1996. In the following two years they tried unsuccessfully to climb Sepu Kangri.

Finally, on October 2, 2002 Carlos Buhler and Mark Newcomb succeeded in first ascent.

== See also ==
- List of ultras of Tibet, East Asia and neighbouring areas
