= Biru County =

Biru County 比如县 • འབྲི་རུ་རྫོང་། Diru, Driru, Biru
- County
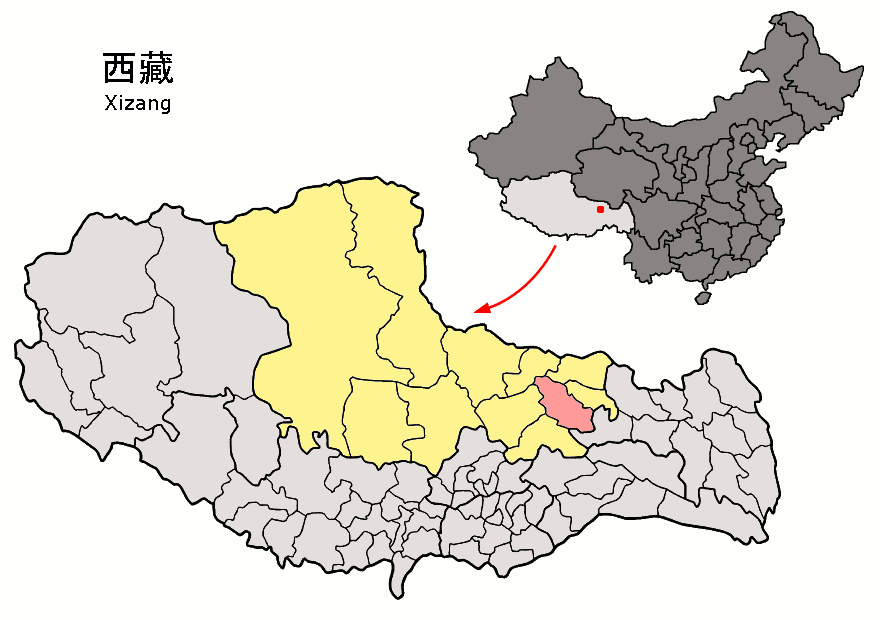
- Location of Biru County (red) within Nagqu City (yellow) and the Tibet Autonomous Region

- Location of the seat in Tibet Autonomous Region Biru (China)
- Coordinates: 31°46′39″N 93°33′00″E
- Country: China
- Autonomous region: Tibet
- Prefecture-level city: Nagqu
- County seat: Biru

Area
  - Total: 11,683.45 km^{2} (4,511.01 sq mi)

Population (2020)
  - Total: 72,618
  - Density: 6.2155/km^{2} (16.098/sq mi)
- Time zone: UTC+8 (China Standard)
- Website: www.xzbr.gov.cn

Biru County

Chinese name
- Simplified Chinese: 比如县
- Traditional Chinese: 比如縣
Transcriptions
Standard Mandarin
- Hanyu Pinyin: Bǐrú Xiàn
Yue: Cantonese
- Jyutping: bei^{2}jyu^{4} jyun^{2}

Tibetan name
- Tibetan: འབྲི་རུ་རྫོང་།
Transcriptions
- Wylie: 'bri ru rdzong
- Tibetan Pinyin: Biru Zong

Biru County (Tibetan: འབྲི་རུ་རྫོང་།; Chinese: 比如县) is the most populated county within Nagqu of the Tibet Autonomous Region, China. The name means "female yak". Either of the following pronunciations can be considered correct in Standard Tibetan: [bìru] ~ [pìru] (conventionally written Biru in English) or [ɖìru] ~ [ʈìru] (conventionally Driru).

== Geography ==
Biru lies in the southwest part of the former province of Kham. To its east is Chamdo and to its west Nagchu. Biru is located on the Gyalmo Ngulchu River (upper part of Salween River). Diru is bordered by Sog County to the northwest and the extreme east of Banbar County་, is also surrounded by Lhari County to the south, and extreme north to the Nagchu county.

Sepu Kangri is located in the county.

== Climate ==
Climate data for Biru, elevation 3,940 m (12,930 ft), (1991–2020 normals)
Month	Jan	Feb	Mar	Apr	May	Jun	Jul	Aug	Sep	Oct	Nov	Dec	Year
Mean daily maximum °C (°F)	2.3 (36.1)	4.6 (40.3)	8.1 (46.6)	12.1 (53.8)	15.9 (60.6)	19.0 (66.2)	20.7 (69.3)	20.8 (69.4)	18.2 (64.8)	12.9 (55.2)	7.9 (46.2)	4.3 (39.7)	12.2 (54.0)
Daily mean °C (°F)	−6.3 (20.7)	−3.5 (25.7)	0.3 (32.5)	4.2 (39.6)	7.9 (46.2)	11.4 (52.5)	12.9 (55.2)	12.6 (54.7)	10.0 (50.0)	4.7 (40.5)	−1.2 (29.8)	−5.2 (22.6)	4.0 (39.2)
Mean daily minimum °C (°F)	−13.3 (8.1)	−10.4 (13.3)	−6.2 (20.8)	−2.1 (28.2)	2.0 (35.6)	5.9 (42.6)	7.6 (45.7)	7.2 (45.0)	4.8 (40.6)	−0.8 (30.6)	−7.6 (18.3)	−12.4 (9.7)	−2.1 (28.2)
Average precipitation mm (inches)	5.8 (0.23)	7.0 (0.28)	10.0 (0.39)	16.8 (0.66)	66.2 (2.61)	132.4 (5.21)	125.4 (4.94)	105.6 (4.16)	86.8 (3.42)	36.2 (1.43)	5.3 (0.21)	3.8 (0.15)	601.3 (23.69)
Average precipitation days (≥ 0.1 mm)	5.0	5.5	7.4	9.7	17.6	23.4	22.0	20.4	20.1	10.9	3.5	2.9	148.4
Average snowy days	6.6	8.0	11.1	12.6	6.1	0.7	0	0	0.3	8.2	4.9	4.2	62.7
Average relative humidity (%)	42	40	41	47	56	64	67	67	67	58	46	40	53
Mean monthly sunshine hours	161.5	160.2	186.3	203.6	216.3	189.8	190.5	196.4	185.7	196.6	180.2	173.2	2,240.3
Percentage possible sunshine	50	51	50	52	51	45	44	48	51	56	57	55	51
Source: China Meteorological Administration

== Administrative divisions ==
Biru county contains the following 2 towns and 8 townships:

Name	Chinese	Hanyu Pinyin	Tibetan	Wylie
Towns
Biru Town	比如镇	Bǐrú zhèn	འབྲི་རུ་གྲོང་རྡལ།	'bri ru grong rdal
Shachu Town	夏曲镇	Xiàqǔ zhèn	ཤག་ཆུ་གྲོང་རྡལ།	shag chu grong rdal
Townships
Benkar Township	白嘎乡	Báigā xiāng	བན་དཀར་ཤང་།	ban dkar shang
Latang Township (Dawatang)	达塘乡	Dátáng xiāng	ཟླ་ཐང་ཤང་།	zla thang shang
Qagzê Township	恰则乡	Qiàzé xiāng	ཆགས་རྩེ་ཤང་།	chags rtse shang
Zala Township	扎拉乡	Zhālā xiāng	རྩྭ་ལ་ཤང་།	rtswa la shang
Yangshok Township	羊秀乡	Yángxiù xiāng	གཡང་ཤོག་ཤང་།	g.yang shog shang
Shamchu Township	香曲乡	Xiāngqǔ xiāng	གཤམ་ཆུ་ཤང་།	gsham chu shang
Lenchu Township	良曲乡	Liángqǔ xiāng	རླན་ཆུ་ཤང་།	rlan chu shang
Tsachu Township	茶曲乡	Cháqǔ xiāng	ཚྭ་ཆུ་ཤང་།	tshwa chu shang

== Demographics ==
At the 2020 PRC census, the county's population was 72,618, of whom:

Name of group	Number	Percentage
Tibetans		98%
Han
Bai
Uyghurs
Others

== Gallery ==
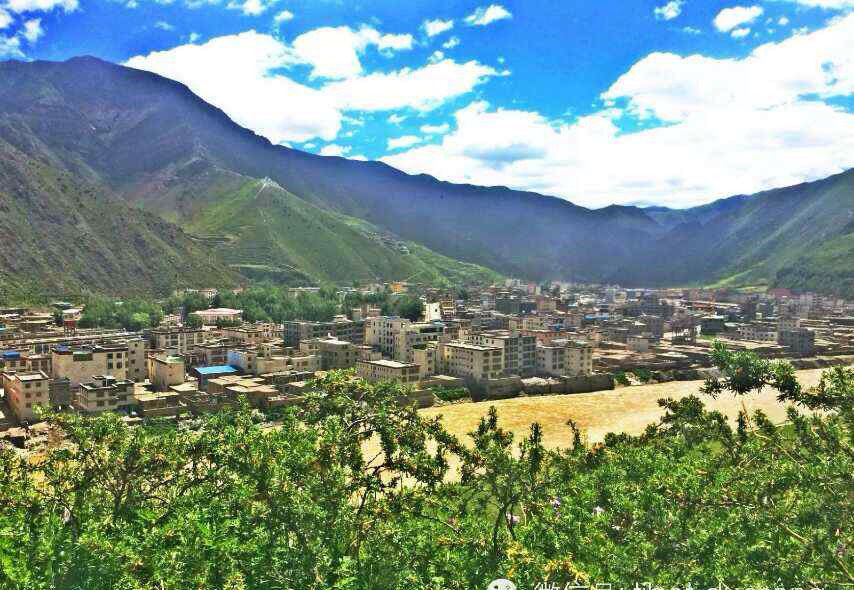
Biru Town from southbank of Gyalmo Ngulchu

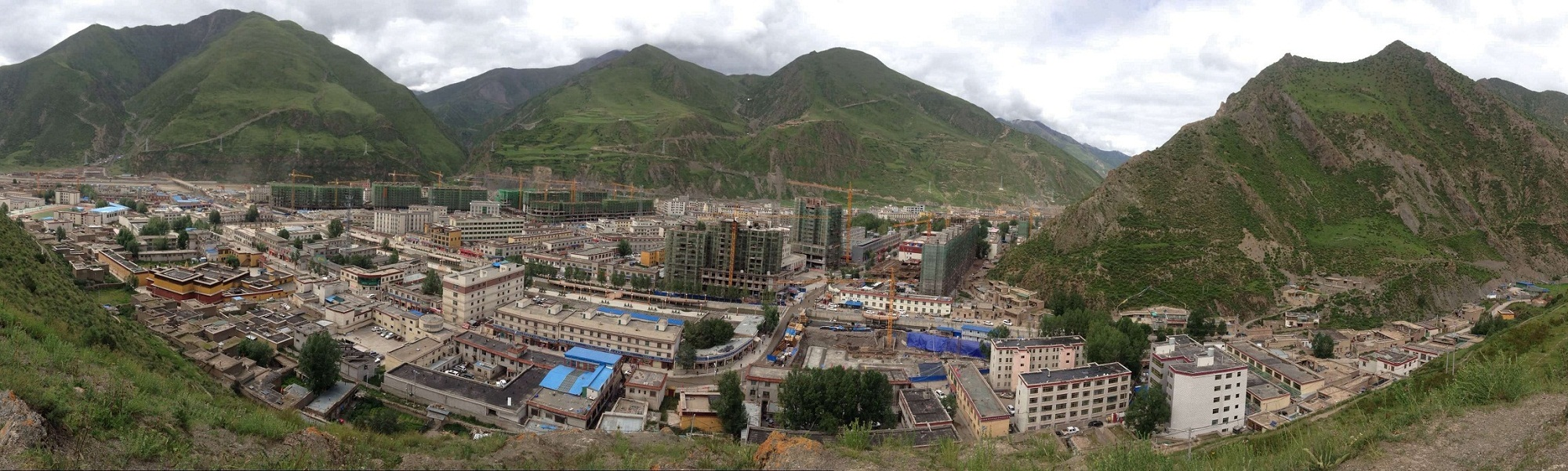
Biru Town from the hill to the north

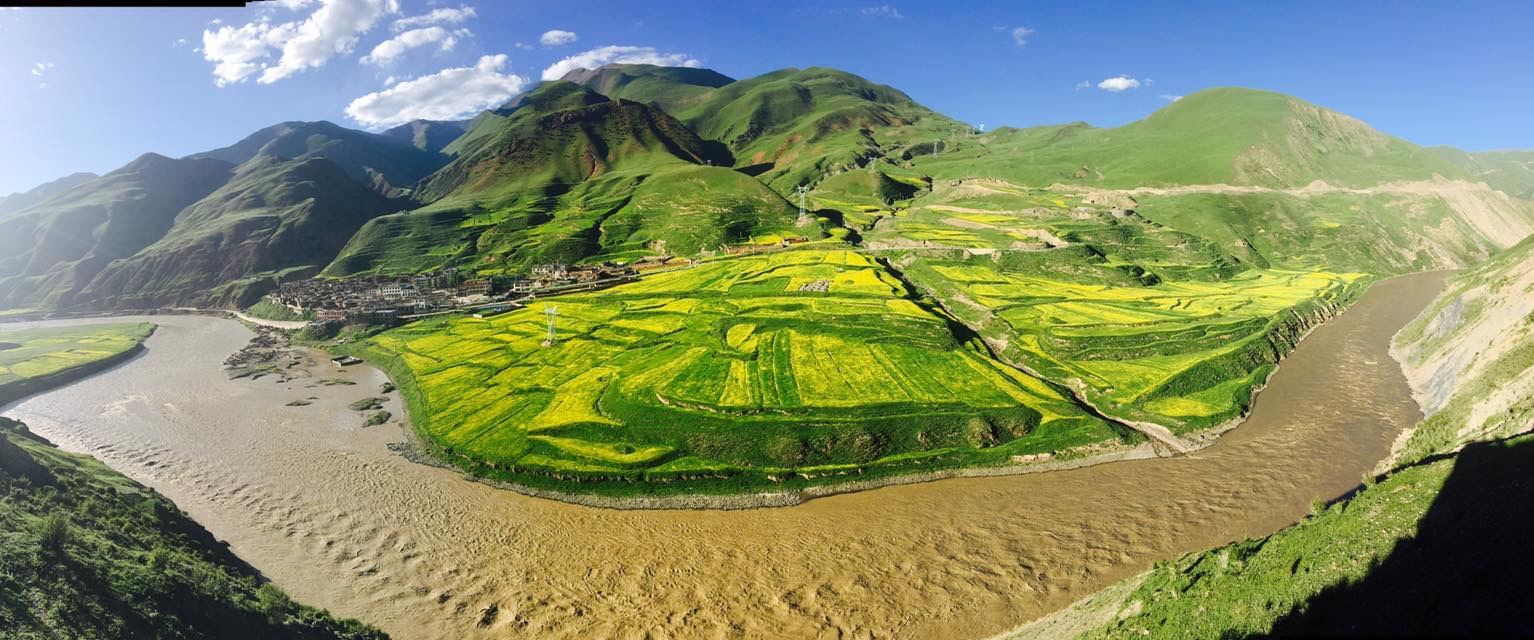
Tsachu/Caqu village

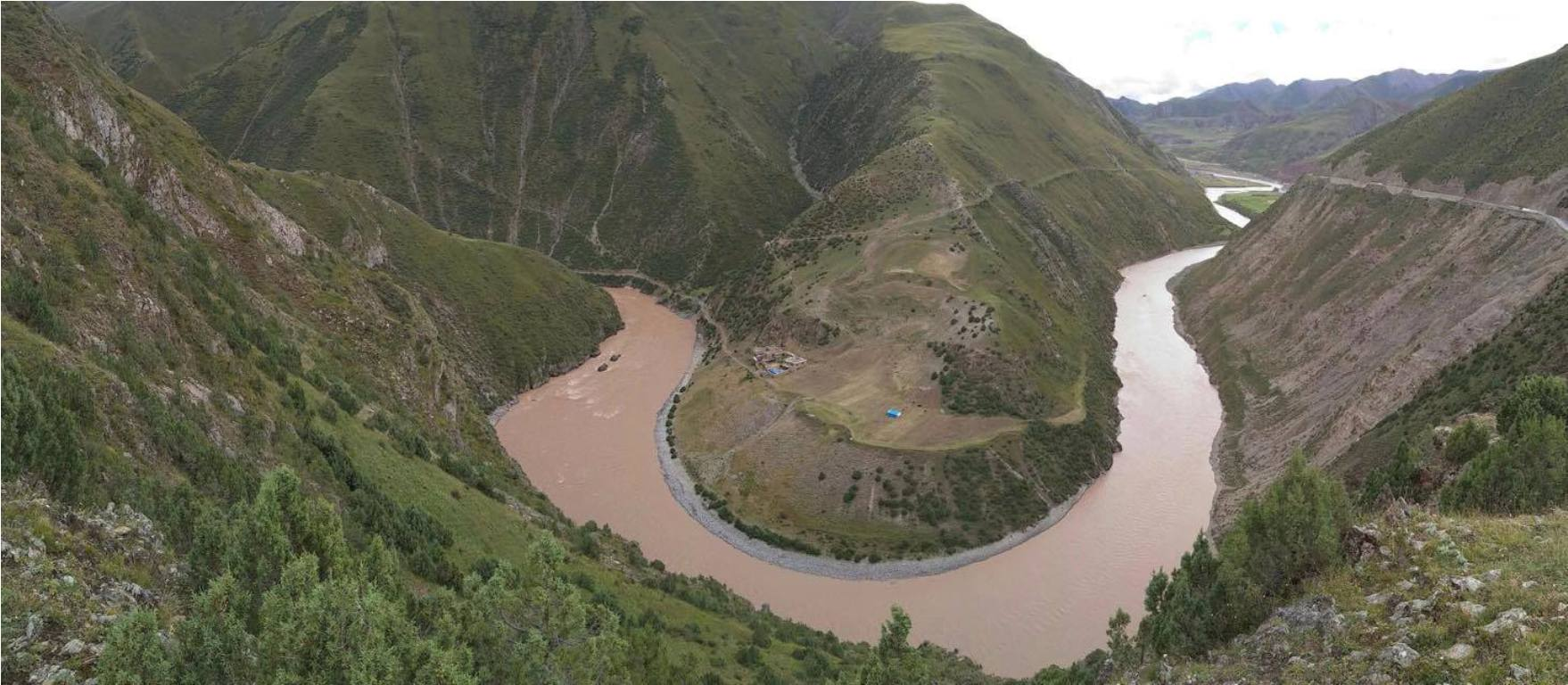
A meander of the river in Biru from the north bank

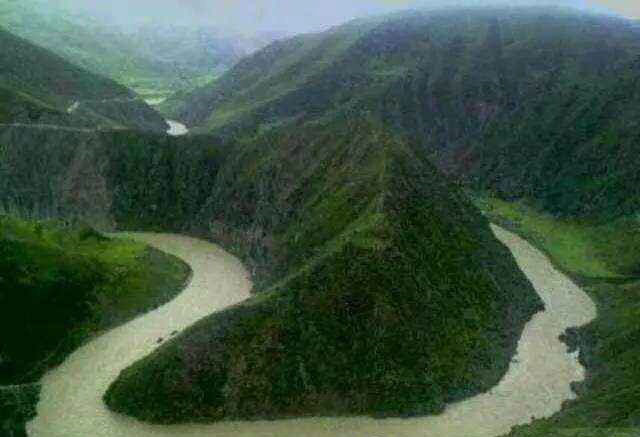
Same meander of the river from the south bank

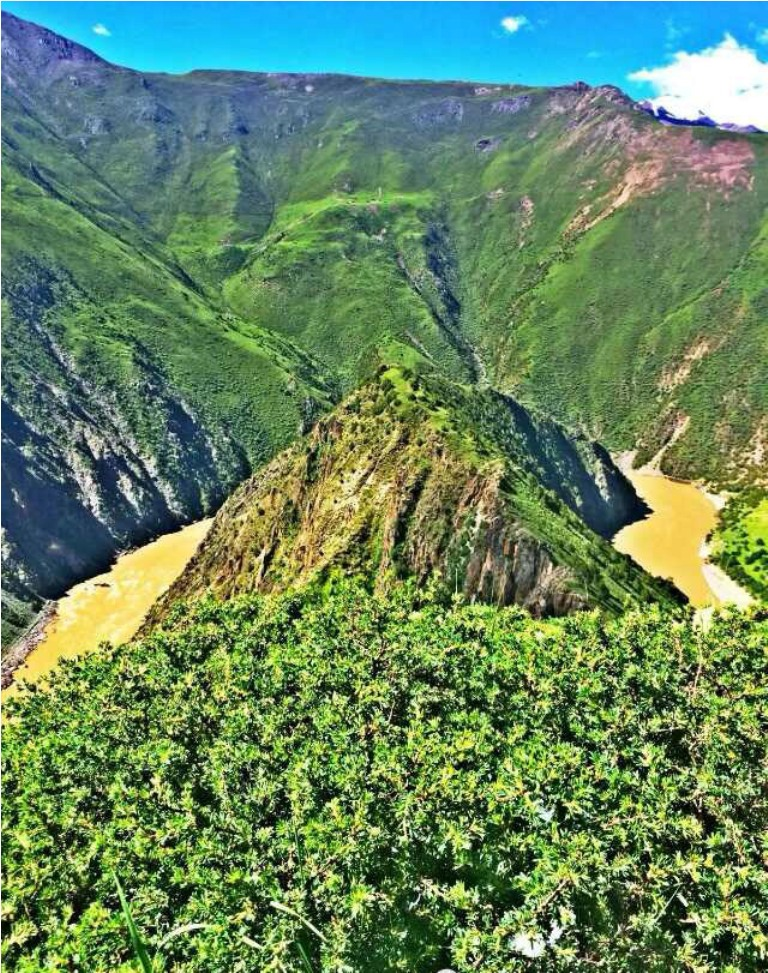
View of a meander from the top

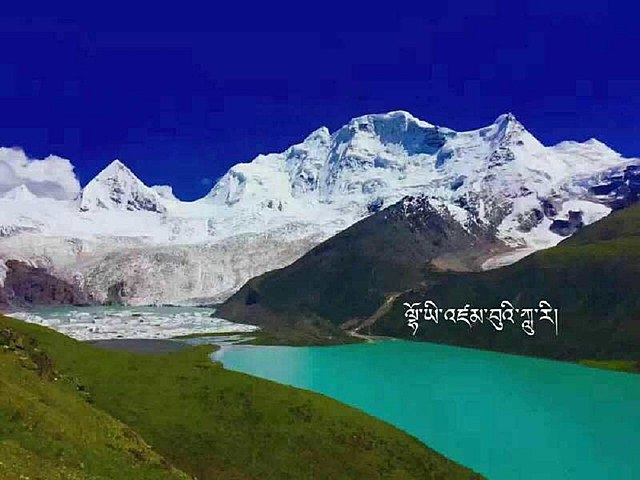
Sepu Kangri

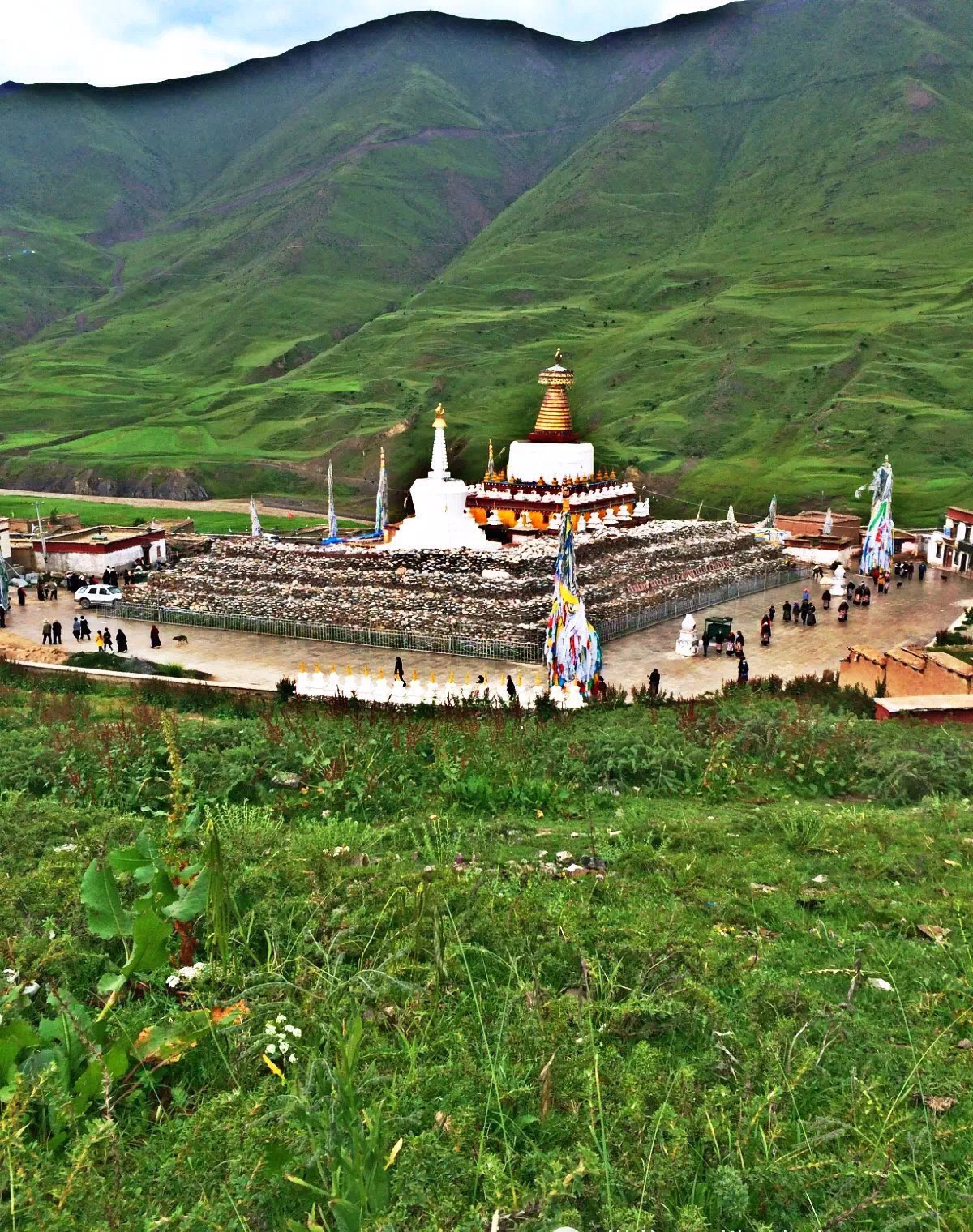
A monastery stupa in Biru

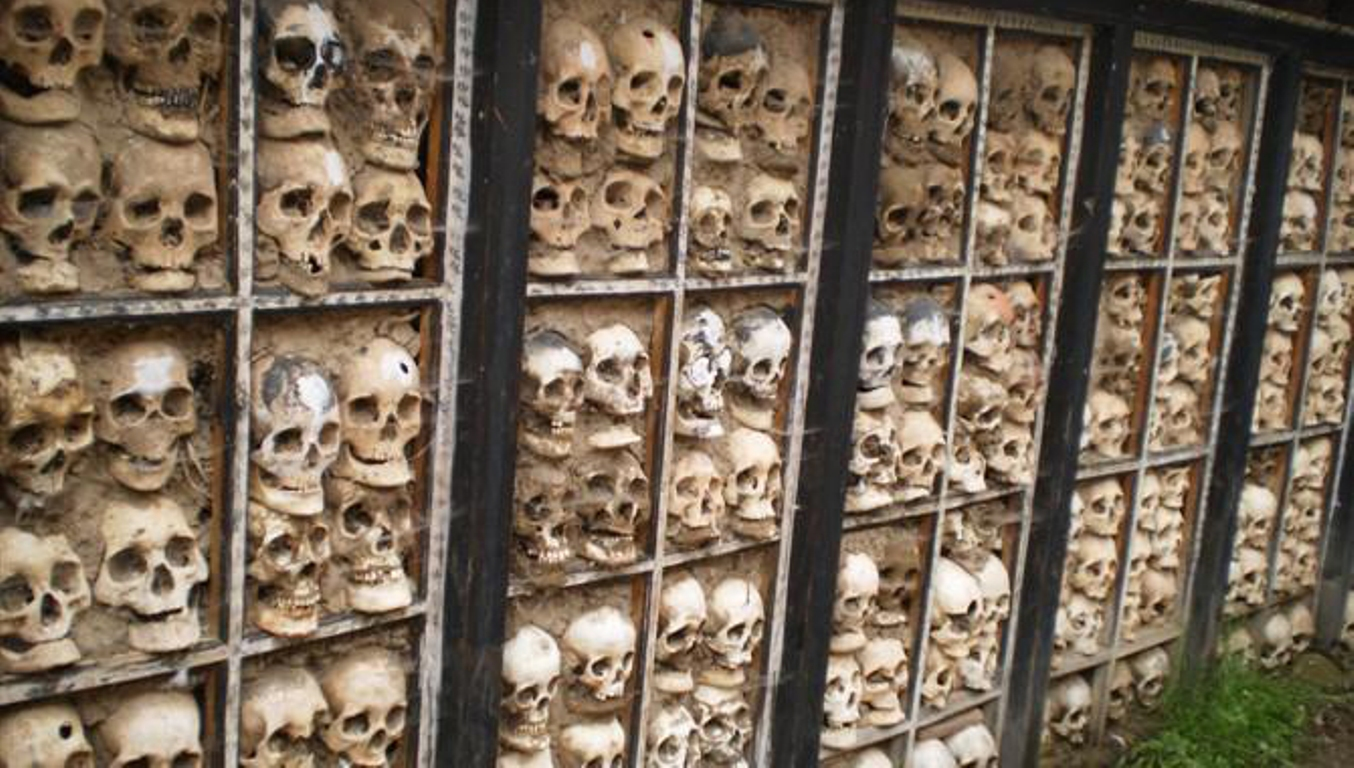
The Biru Skull Wall, a local funerary practice

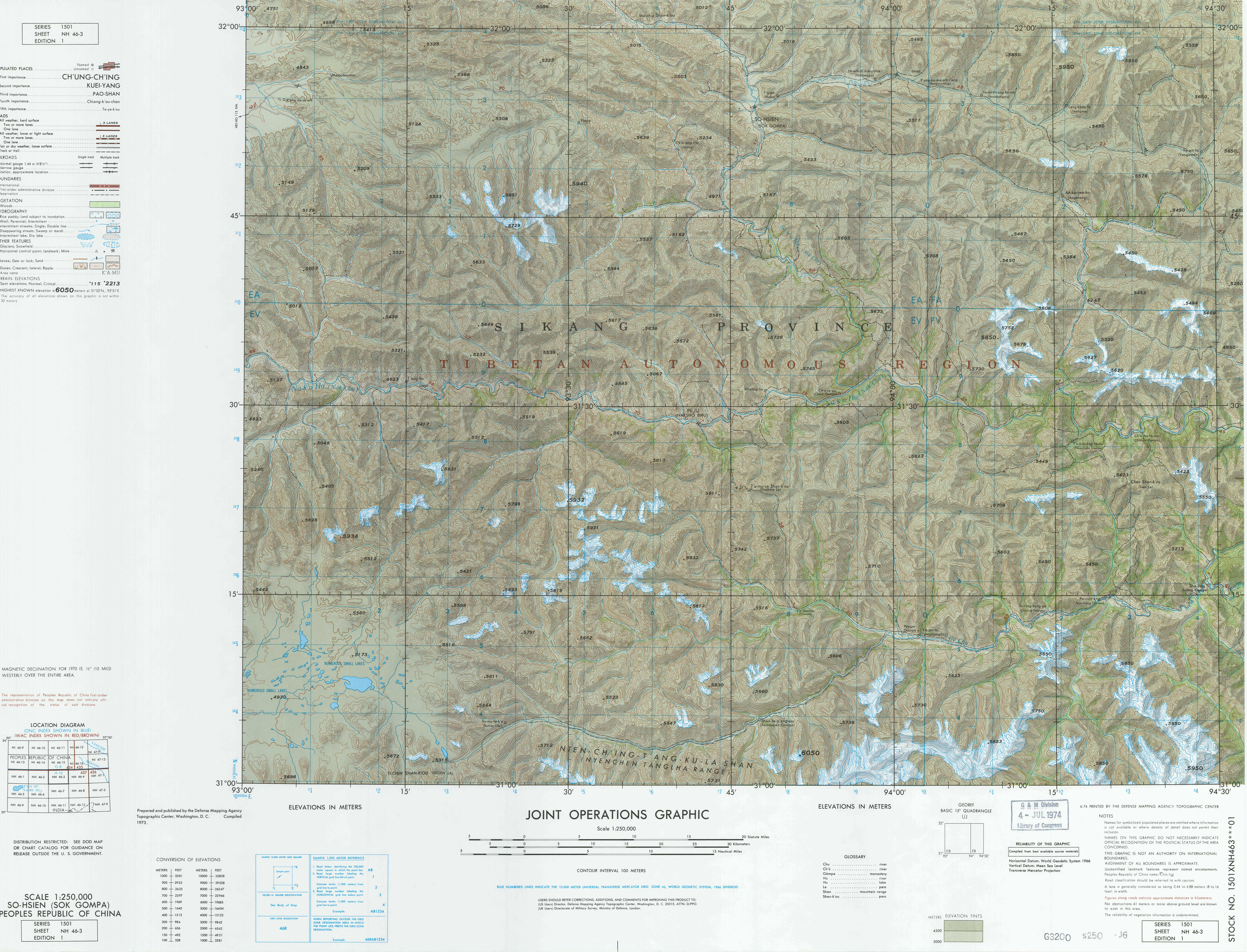
