= Shinjuku Southern Terrace =

Coordinates: 35°41′12.4″N 139°42′2.5″E

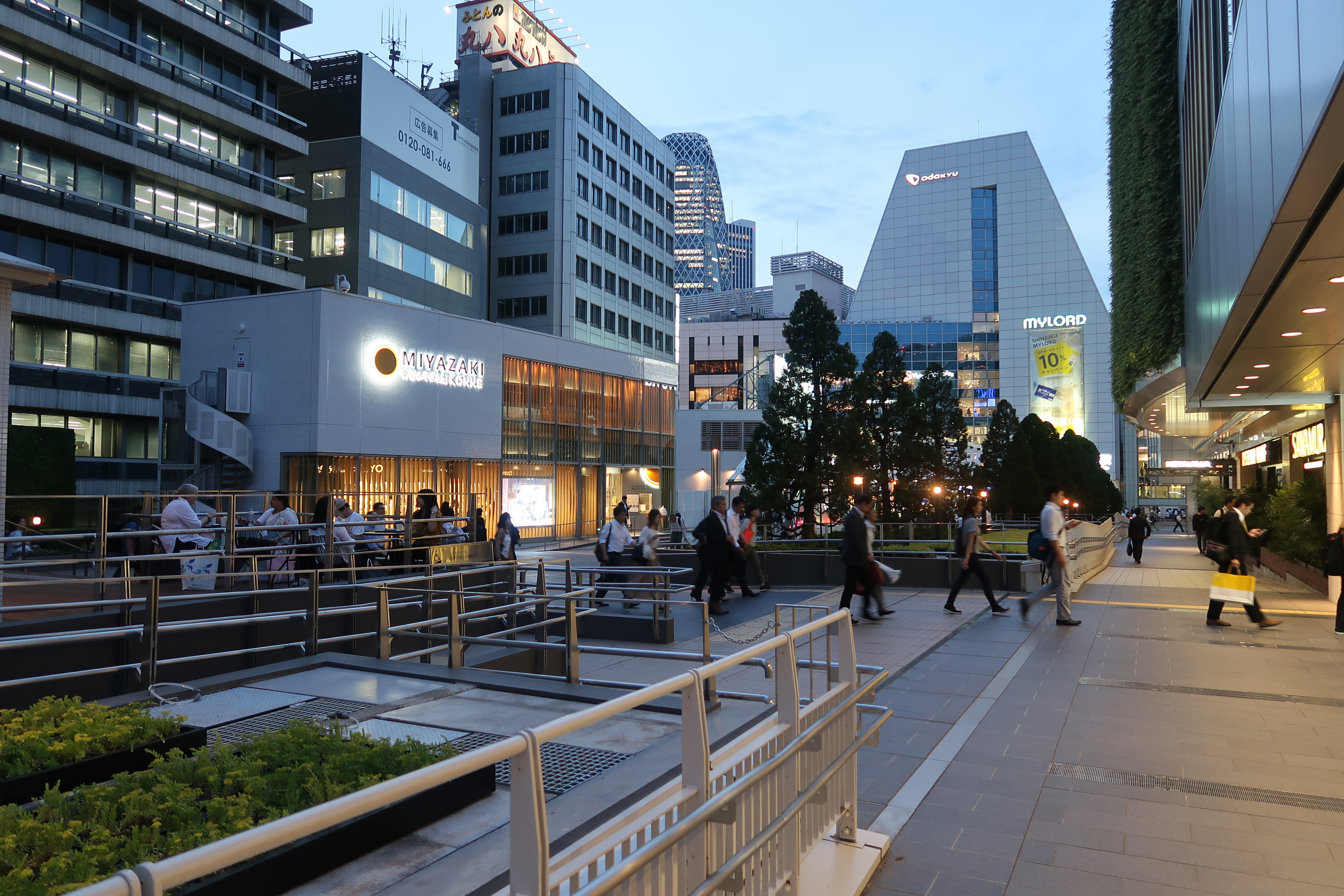
Shinjuku Southern Terrace

Shinjuku Southern Terrace (Japanese: 新宿サザンテラス) is a commercial zone located at Yoyogi 2-chōme, Shibuya, Tokyo, at the western side of Shinjuku Station Southern Exit.

== History ==
The terrace was built above the Odakyu Odawara Line, to the west of Takashimaya Times Square across the Yamanote Line, and to the south of Shinjuku Mylord. The location opened in April 1998. Shinjuku Southern Terrace is the southern portion of Shinjuku Terrace City, a continuous piece of real estate property owned by Odakyu Group in and around Shinjuku Station.

== Access ==
Shinjuku Southern Terrace is only a one-minute walk away from the South exit of the Shinjuku Station, and a 10-minute walk from the West exit.

== Layout ==
Located in the Odakyu Southern Tower, there are four floors of shops. On the first floor there is a 7-eleven. On the second floor, there is a Shake Shack restaurant. On the third floor, there are a FedEx Kinko's office and printing center, Villa Bianchi Italian Restaurant, and Maharaja Indian restaurant. On the fourth floor are two restaurant/bars: Symphony Orchestra Japanese restaurant, and Banyoh steak restaurant. Also located in the Odakyu Southern Tower in the Hotel Century, located on the 19th through the 35th floors. On the 19th floor there is YURAKUCHO KAKIDA, a sushi and teppan-yaki restaurant. On the 20th floor you have the Lounge South Court, which consists of a bar and lounge, and Southern Tower Dining which is a restaurant.

In the area just outside the Odakyu Southern Tower, is the terrace area, which also has a handful of restaurants and shops. These include Starbucks, Tim Ho Wan, and Franc Franc.

== Events ==
Shinjuku Southern Terrace has many different lighting events throughout the year.
