= NTT Docomo Yoyogi Building =

Headquarters of NTT located in Japan

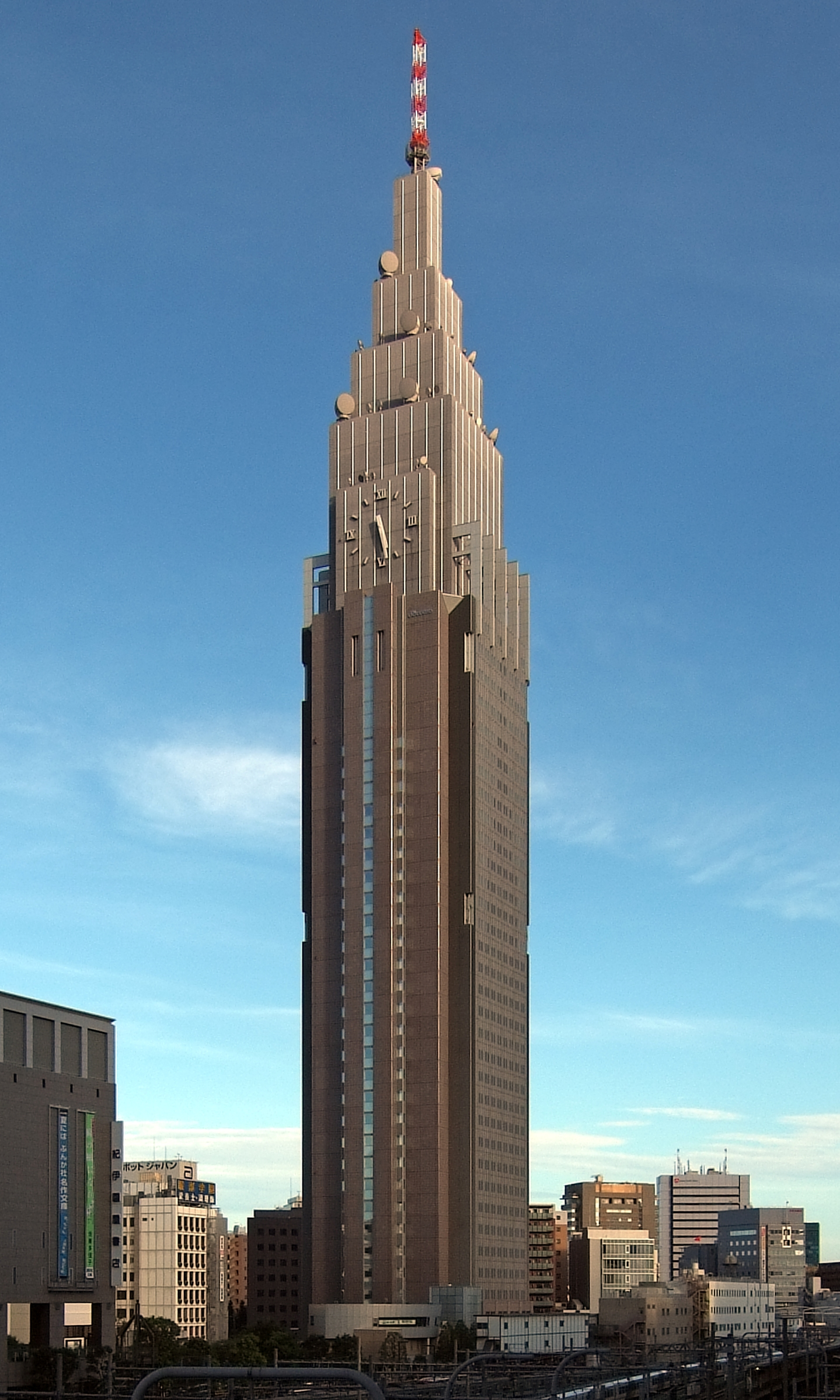
- NTT Docomo Yoyogi Building, the 2nd tallest clock tower in the world
- Interactive map of the NTT Docomo Yoyogi Building area

General information
- Location: Shibuya, Tokyo, Japan
- Coordinates: 35°41′3.7″N 139°42′11.7″E
- Construction started: 1997
- Completed: 2000
- Opening: September 2000

Height
- Antenna spire: 272 meters (892 ft)
- Roof: 240 meters (790 ft)

Technical details
- Floor count: 27 above ground 3 below ground
- Floor area: 51,122 m^{2} (550,270 sq ft)

Design and construction
- Architect: Kajima Design

The NTT Docomo Yoyogi Building (NTTドコモ代々木ビル, Enu Tī Tī Dokomo Yoyogi Biru) is a skyscraper located in the Sendagaya district of Shibuya, Tokyo, Japan. At 240 meters (790 ft) tall, it is the ninth tallest building in Tokyo.

== Function ==
The NTT Docomo Yoyogi Building is owned by the NTT Docomo group. Despite the building's name, it is not the head office for the company, whose headquarters are located in the top floors of the Sannō Park Tower. The building houses some offices, but is mainly used to house technical equipment (switching equipment, etc.) for the company's cellular telephone service.

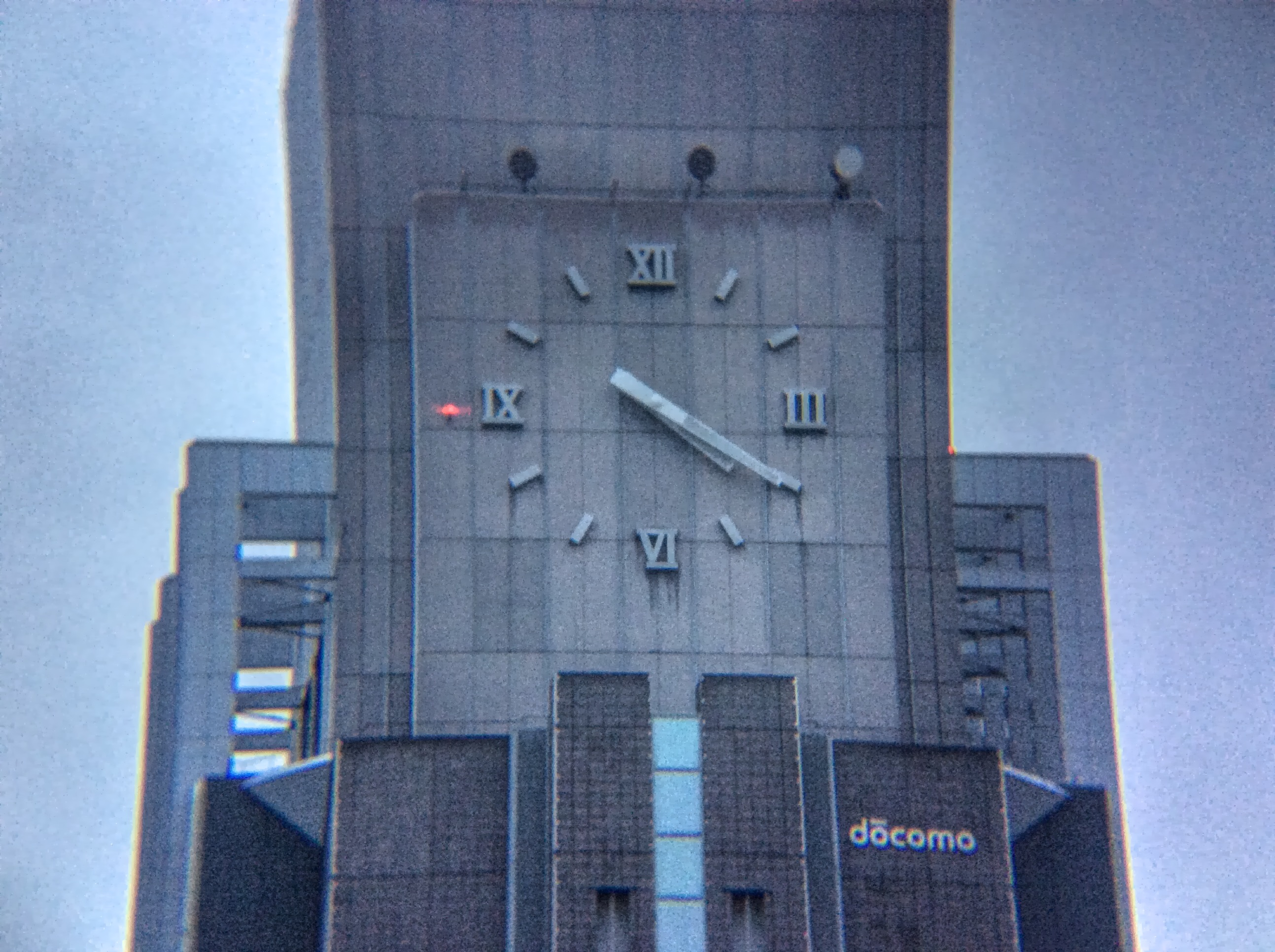
Close-up of clock face detail

To commemorate NTT Docomo's 10th anniversary, a 15-meter-diameter clock was put into operation in November 2002.

Solar energy is partially used to power the building. A garbage separation system employed within the tower helps to reduce waste and increase the recycling rate. The waste water is recycled for reuse, and rainwater is reused for the building's toilets.

== Images ==
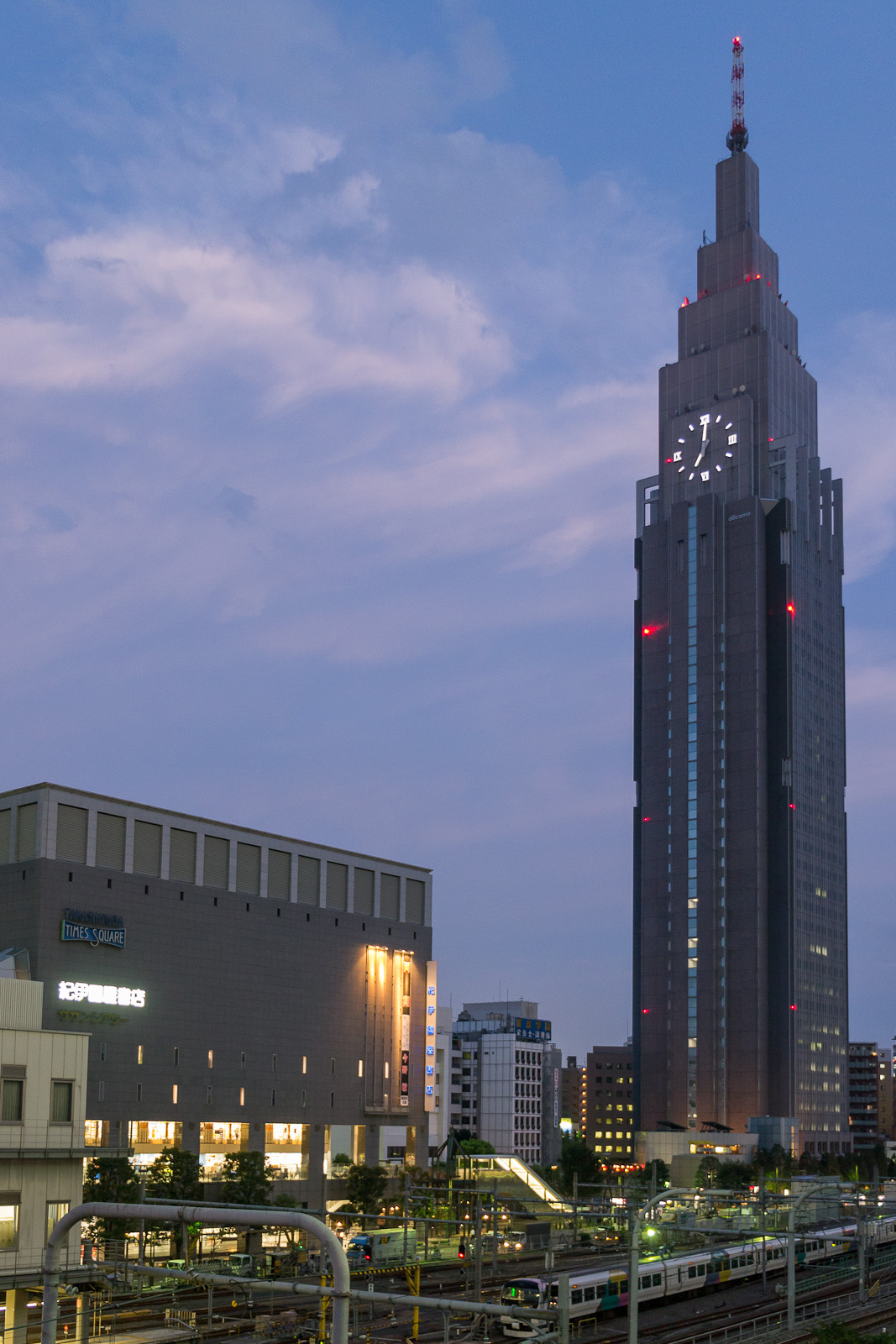
Night view from Yoyogi

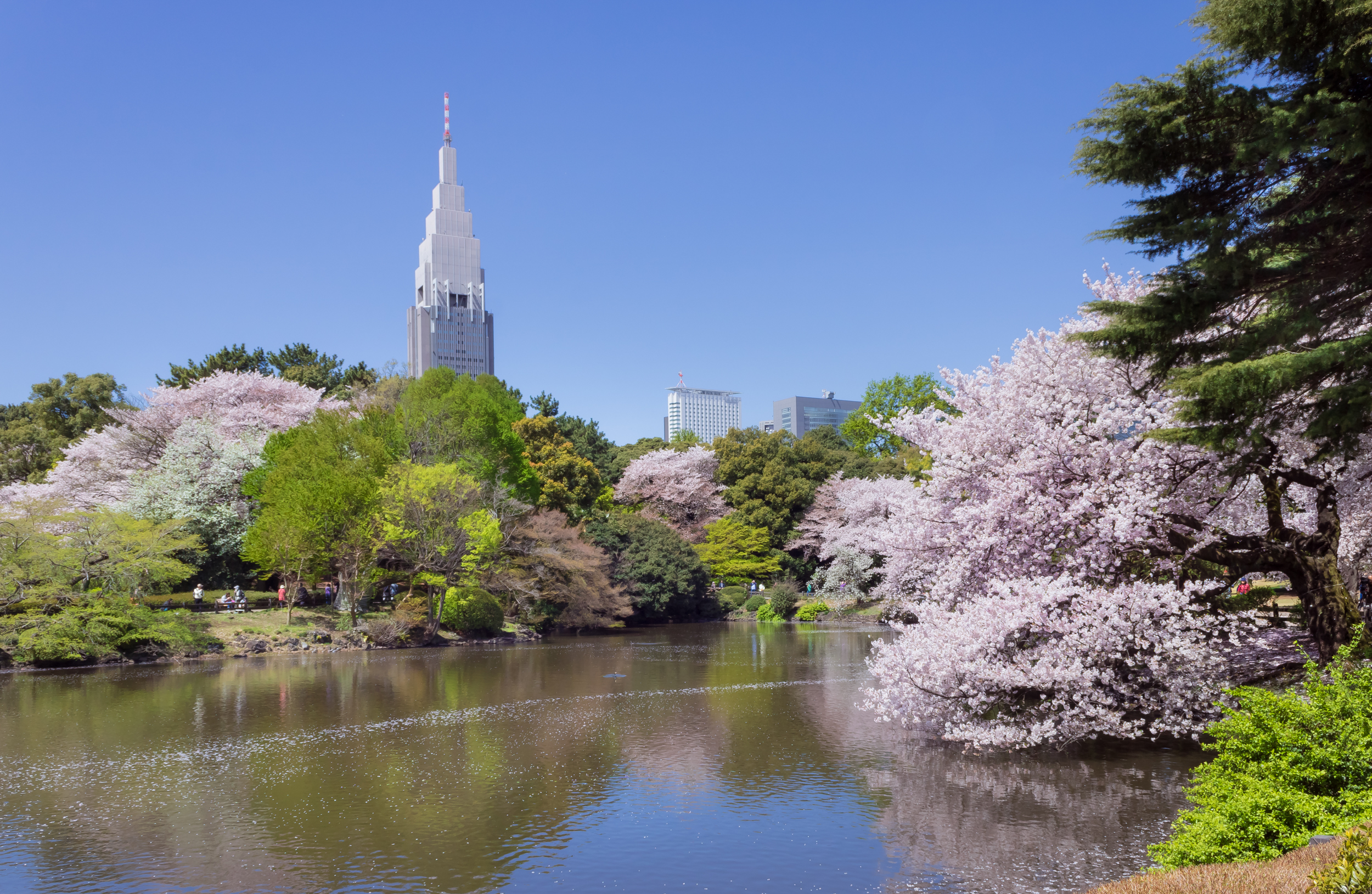
The tower from Shinjuku Gyoen National Garden

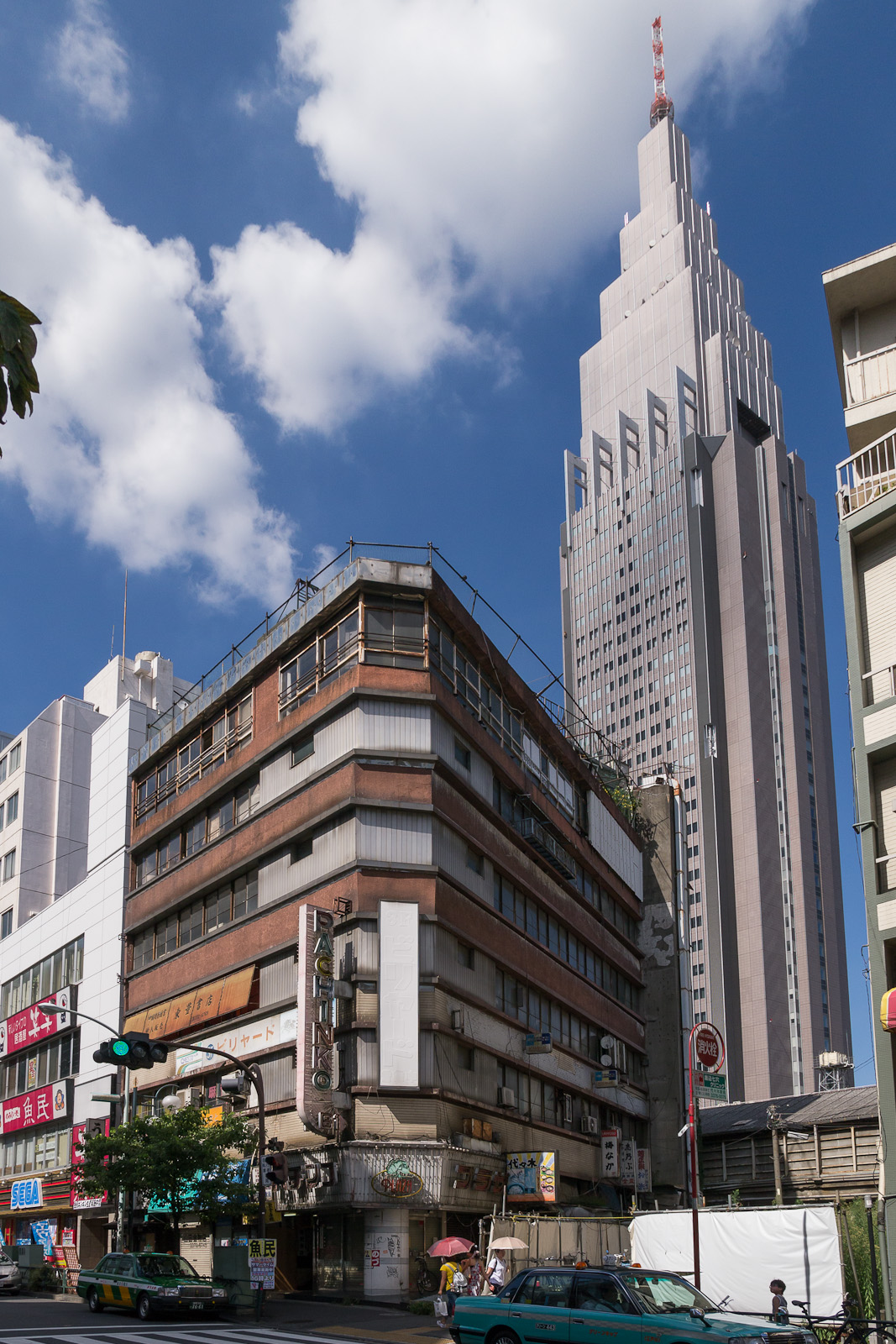
Side view with Yoyogi Kaikan Building in foreground

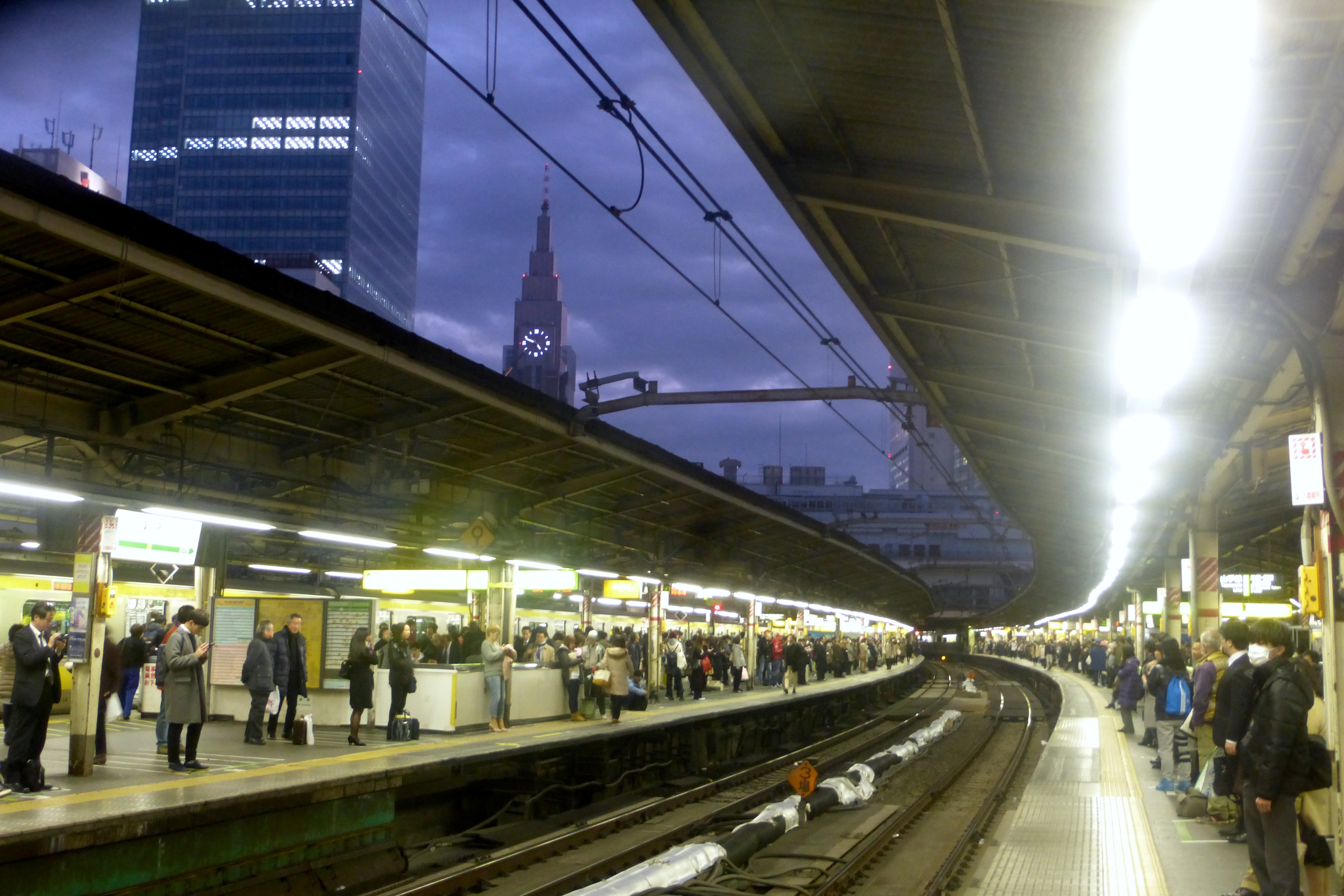
View of clock from Shinjuku station

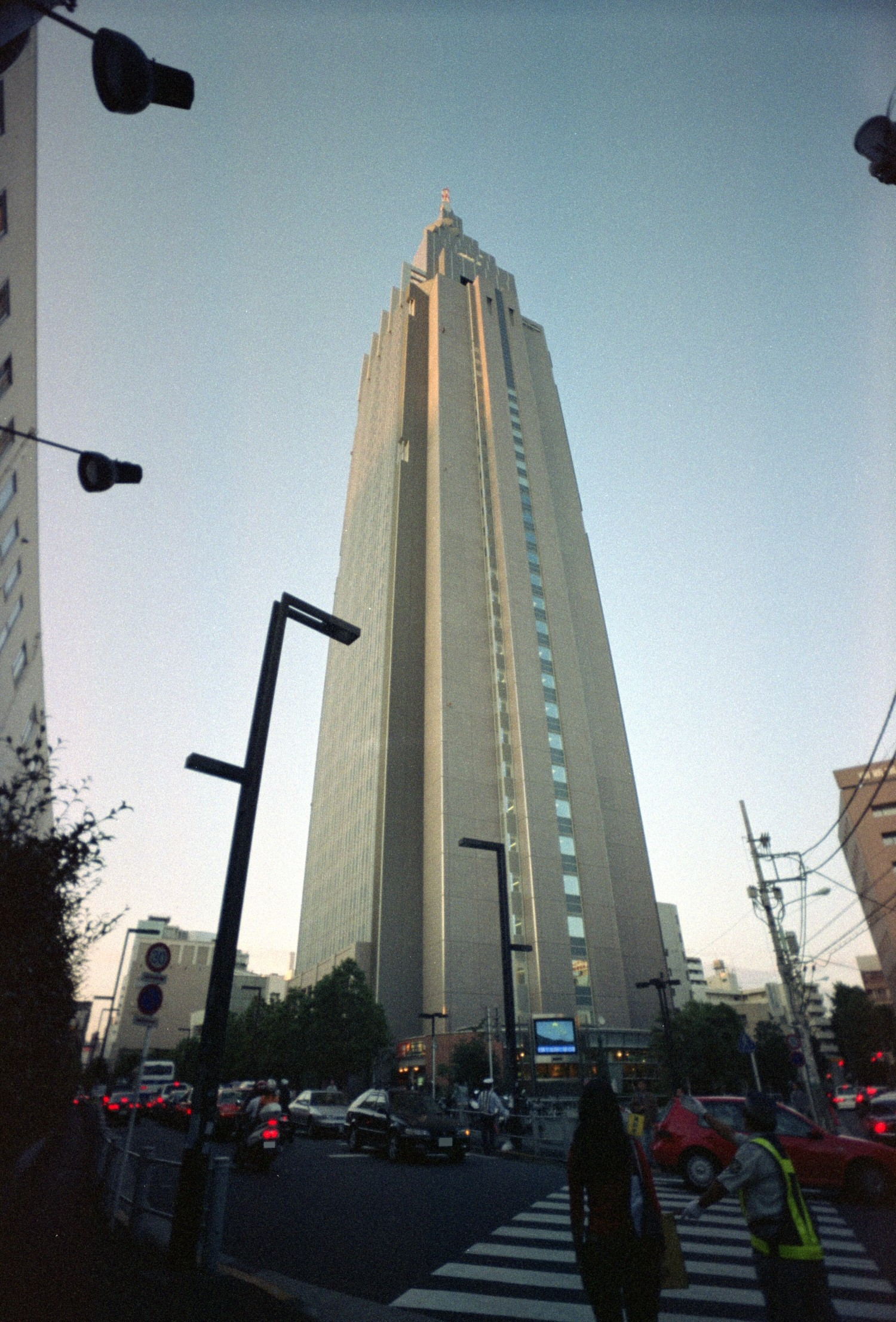
Ground level view from Yoyogi station east

== See also ==
- 33 Thomas Street
- Empire State Building
- List of tallest buildings and structures in the world
- List of tallest buildings and structures in Japan
