= Biru Town =

Biru
- Town
- 比如镇
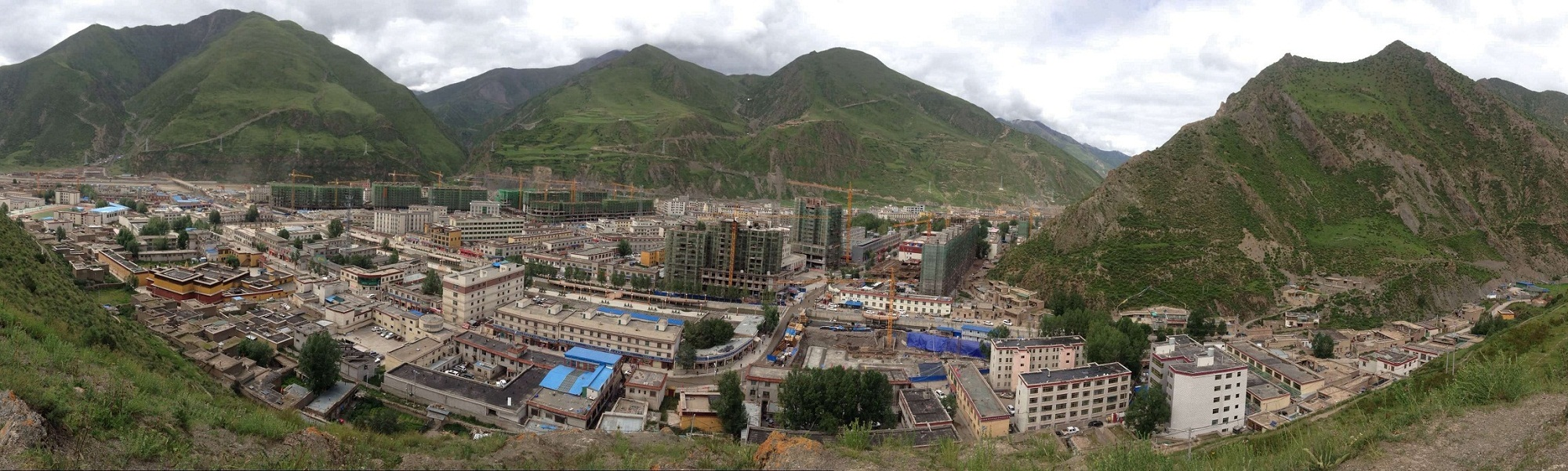

- Location in the Tibet Autonomous Region
- Coordinates: 31°28′47″N 93°40′51″E
- Country: China
- Province-level division: Tibet Autonomous Region
- Prefecture: Nagqu Prefecture
- County: Biru County
- Elevation: 3,912 m (12,835 ft)
- Time zone: UTC+8 (China Standard)
- Postal code: 852300
- Area code: 0896

Biru (Chinese: 比如镇; pinyin: Bǐrú zhèn) is a town in and the seat of the Biru County, eastern Tibet Autonomous Region, Western China. It lies at an altitude of around 3,900 metres (12,800 ft). Biru is located on the Gyalmo Ngulchu River (upper part of Salween River).

== See also ==
- List of towns and villages in Tibet Autonomous Region
