= Sog, Tibet =

Sog
- Town

Tibetan transcription(s)
  - Tibetan: སོག་རྫོང་
  - Wylie transliteration: sog rdzong

Chinese transcription(s)
  - Traditional: 索县
  - Pinyin: Suǒ Xiàn
- Location within Tibet Autonomous Region
- Coordinates: 31°52′N 93°46′E
- Country: China
- Region: Tibet
- Prefecture: Nagqu Prefecture
- County: Xainza County

Population (2004)
  - Major Nationalities: Tibetan
  - Regional dialect: Tibetan language
- Time zone: +8

Sog (also Sogba) is a town and seat of Sog County in the Nagqu Prefecture of the Tibet Autonomous Region of China. It lies on the G317 highway between Zala and Baqên Town.

== See also ==
- List of towns and villages in Tibet Autonomous Region
