= Stool osmotic gap =

Stool osmotic gap is a measurement of the difference in solute types between serum and feces, used to distinguish among different causes of diarrhea.

Feces is normally in osmotic equilibrium with blood serum, which the human body maintains between 290–300 mOsm/kg. However, the solutes contributing to this total differ. Serum is mostly sodium and potassium salts (as reflected in the formulas for serum osmol gap and anion gap), while the digestive tract contains significant amounts of other compounds. Stool osmotic gap is a measure of the concentration of those other compounds.

Stool osmotic gap is calculated as 290 mOsm/kg − 2 × (stool Na + stool K). 290 mOsm/kg is the presumed stool osmolality, and the measured concentration of sodium and potassium cations is doubled to account for the corresponding anions which must be present.

A normal gap is between 50 and 100 mOsm/kg, corresponding to the concentration of other solutes such as magnesium salts and sugars.

A low stool osmotic gap suggests secretory diarrhea, wherein the digestive tract is hyperpermeable and losing electrolytes, while a high gap suggests osmotic diarrhea, wherein the digestive tract is unable to absorb solutes from the chyme, either because the digestive tract is hypopermeable (e.g. due to inflammation), or non-absorbable compounds (e.g. Epsom salt) are present. The reason for this is that secreted sodium and potassium ions make up a greater percentage of the stool osmolality in secretory diarrhea, whereas in osmotic diarrhea, other molecules such as unabsorbed carbohydrates are more significant contributors to stool osmolality.

High osmotic gap (>100 mOsm/kg) causes of osmotic diarrhea include celiac sprue, chronic pancreatitis, lactase deficiency, lactulose, osmotic laxative use/abuse, and Whipple's disease.

Low osmotic gap (<50 mOsm/kg) causes of secretory diarrhea include toxin-mediated causes (cholera, enterotoxigenic strains of E. coli) and secretagogues such as vasoactive intestinal peptide (from a VIPoma, for example). Uncommon causes include gastrinoma, medullary thyroid carcinoma (which produces excess calcitonin), factitious diarrhea from non-osmotic laxative abuse and villous adenoma.
