= Sog County =

Sog County 索县 • སོག་རྫོང་། Suoxian
- County
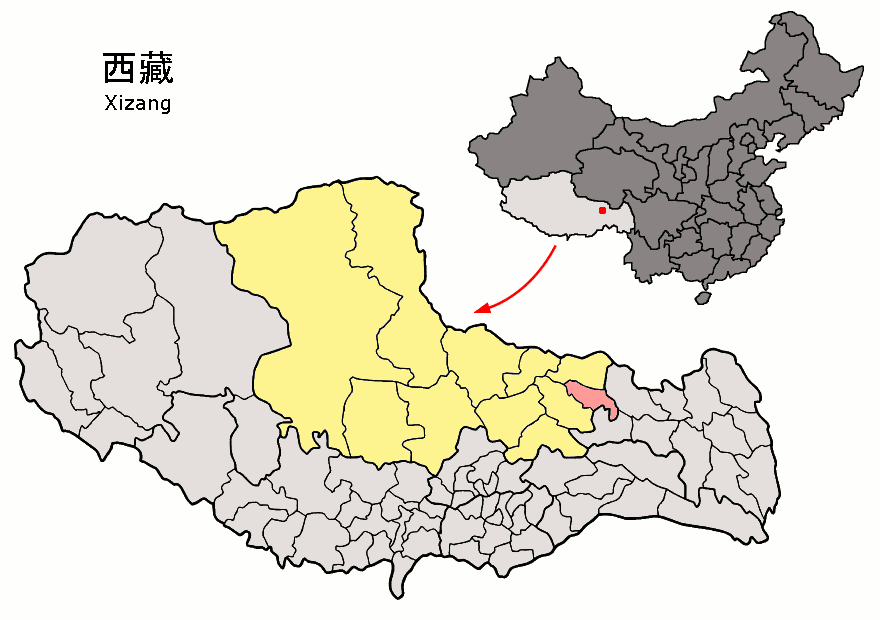
- Location of Sog County (red) within Nagqu City (yellow) and the Tibet Autonomous Region

- Location of the seat in the Tibet AR Sog County (China)
- Coordinates: 31°53′17″N 93°47′06″E
- Country: China
- Autonomous region: Tibet
- Prefecture-level city: Nagqu
- County seat: Yakla (Sog)

Area
  - Total: 5,858.68 km^{2} (2,262.05 sq mi)

Population (2020)
  - Total: 52,923
  - Density: 9.0333/km^{2} (23.396/sq mi)
- Time zone: UTC+8 (China Standard)
- Website: www.xzsx.gov.cn

Sog County

Chinese name
- Simplified Chinese: 索县
- Traditional Chinese: 索縣
Transcriptions
Standard Mandarin
- Hanyu Pinyin: Suǒ Xiàn

Tibetan name
- Tibetan: སོག་རྫོང་།
Transcriptions
- Wylie: sog rdzong
- Tibetan Pinyin: Sog Zong

Sog County (Tibetan: སོག་རྫོང་།, Chinese: 索县) is a county under the administration of the prefecture-level city of Nagqu of the Tibet Autonomous Region, China.

== Geography ==
Sog Dzong lies in the extreme western part of the former province of Kham. To its east is Chamdo and to its west Nagchu. Sogdzong is located between the Drachen and Driru, on the Sogchu River. It is the source of Gyalmo Ngulchu.

=== Climate ===
Sog County has a dry-winter alpine subarctic climate (Köppen Dwc) with mild, rainy summers and freezing to frigid, dry winters with large diurnal temperature variations.

Climate data for Sogxian, elevation 4,023 m (13,199 ft), (1991–2020 normals)
Month	Jan	Feb	Mar	Apr	May	Jun	Jul	Aug	Sep	Oct	Nov	Dec	Year
Record high °C (°F)	14.4 (57.9)	13.4 (56.1)	22.0 (71.6)	22.4 (72.3)	25.4 (77.7)	26.7 (80.1)	26.8 (80.2)	26.7 (80.1)	28.0 (82.4)	22.1 (71.8)	15.0 (59.0)	14.6 (58.3)	28.0 (82.4)
Mean daily maximum °C (°F)	−0.4 (31.3)	2.5 (36.5)	6.3 (43.3)	10.3 (50.5)	13.8 (56.8)	16.9 (62.4)	19.2 (66.6)	19.2 (66.6)	16.2 (61.2)	10.7 (51.3)	5.6 (42.1)	2.0 (35.6)	10.2 (50.4)
Daily mean °C (°F)	−8.7 (16.3)	−5.2 (22.6)	−1.0 (30.2)	2.9 (37.2)	6.5 (43.7)	10.1 (50.2)	12.1 (53.8)	11.7 (53.1)	8.8 (47.8)	3.2 (37.8)	−2.8 (27.0)	−7.0 (19.4)	2.6 (36.6)
Mean daily minimum °C (°F)	−15.9 (3.4)	−12.1 (10.2)	−7.5 (18.5)	−3.4 (25.9)	0.8 (33.4)	5.0 (41.0)	6.9 (44.4)	6.4 (43.5)	3.7 (38.7)	−2.2 (28.0)	−9.3 (15.3)	−14.5 (5.9)	−3.5 (25.7)
Record low °C (°F)	−31.0 (−23.8)	−28.5 (−19.3)	−22.7 (−8.9)	−15.0 (5.0)	−8.7 (16.3)	−3.6 (25.5)	−4.0 (24.8)	−3.5 (25.7)	−7.0 (19.4)	−18 (0)	−23.2 (−9.8)	−30.4 (−22.7)	−31.0 (−23.8)
Average precipitation mm (inches)	8.3 (0.33)	7.7 (0.30)	10.8 (0.43)	17.3 (0.68)	66.1 (2.60)	139.2 (5.48)	119.8 (4.72)	104.3 (4.11)	90.6 (3.57)	34.2 (1.35)	4.8 (0.19)	3.5 (0.14)	606.6 (23.9)
Average precipitation days (≥ 0.1 mm)	5.6	5.7	7.2	10.2	18.6	23.2	20.7	19.3	20.5	11.3	3.5	2.4	148.2
Average snowy days	7.1	7.9	10.6	13.5	10.1	1.3	0.2	0.1	1.0	10.3	5.9	4.2	72.2
Average relative humidity (%)	44	40	41	47	59	67	68	68	70	61	48	40	54
Mean monthly sunshine hours	190.5	176.7	191.9	204.2	207.3	187.3	206.7	206.8	185.2	203.9	208.4	205.6	2,374.5
Percentage possible sunshine	59	56	51	52	48	44	48	51	51	59	67	66	54
Source 1: China Meteorological Administration all-time extreme temperature (for a station at 4220m amsl)
Source 2: Météo Climat (extremes)

== Administrative divisions ==
Sog County contains 2 towns and 8 townships.

Name	Chinese	Hanyu Pinyin	Tibetan	Wylie
Towns
Yakla Town (Sog)	亚拉镇	Yàlā zhèn	གཡག་ལ་གྲོང་རྡལ།	g.yag la grong rdal
Rongpo Town	荣布镇	Róngbù zhèn	རོང་པོ་གྲོང་རྡལ།	rong po grong rdal
Townships
Drogta Township	若达乡	Ruòdá xiāng	དབྲོག་རྟ་ཤང་།	dbrog sta shang
Gyälchen Township	加勤乡	Jiāqín xiāng	རྒྱལ་ཆེན་ཤང་།	rgyal chen shang
Thrido Township	赤多乡	Chìduō xiāng	ཁྲི་རྡོ་ཤང་།	khri rdo shang
Sertam Township	西昌乡	Xīchāng xiāng	གསེར་ཊམ་ཤང་།	gser tam shang
Chakda Township	江达乡	Jiāngdá xiāng	ལྕགས་མདའ་ཤང་།	lcags mda' shang
Riwar Township	热瓦乡	Rèwǎ xiāng	རི་དབར་ཤང་།	ri dbar shang
Garmé Township	嘎美乡	Gāměi xiāng	སྒར་སྨད་ཤང་།	sgar smad shang
Karmo Township	嘎木乡	Gāmù xiāng	དཀར་མོ་ཤང་།	dkar mo shang

== Economy ==
Crops include barley, wheat, radish, potatoes, etc. and yaks, sheep, goat, cows, and horses are reared. Nomads move four times annually according to seasons. The county contains Tsangdain Monastery, built in 1667, resembling the Potala Palace.

== Transport ==
- China National Highway 317
