= Janus kinase inhibitor =

Immune modulating medication

- Drug class

Class identifiers
- ATC code: L04AF
- Mode of action: Anti-inflammatory/ immunosuppressant
- Mechanism of action: Enzyme inhibitor
- Biological target: Janus kinase

Legal status

A Janus kinase inhibitor, also known as JAK inhibitor or jakinib, is a type of immune modulating medication, which inhibits the activity of one or more of the Janus kinase family of enzymes (JAK1, JAK2, JAK3, TYK2), thereby interfering with the JAK-STAT signaling pathway in lymphocytes.

JAK inhibitors are used in the treatment of some cancers and inflammatory diseases such as rheumatoid arthritis and various skin conditions. A Janus kinase 3 inhibitor is attractive as a possible treatment of various autoimmune diseases since its function is mainly restricted to lymphocytes. JAK inhibitors can suppress the signaling of pro-inflammatory cytokines. Pro-inflammatory cytokines are major contributors to the cause of an over active immune system, resulting in inflammation and pain. JAK inhibitors have the ability to slow down this over activity by the suppression of the intracellular signaling.

== Contraindications ==
JAK enzymes are part of the JAK/STAT pathway. This signaling pathway transmits chemical signals from the outside of cells, specifically lymphocytes, and into the cell nucleus. Signals relayed by JAK3 aid in the maturation and regulation of growth of T cells and natural killer cells. While this process is important, it can have negative side effects in the body as well for reasons that remain mostly unknown. In some people, JAK3 and the STAT pathway can cause synovial inflammation, joint destruction, and autoantibody production. JAK3 inhibitors necessarily cause a loss or total absence of T cells and natural killer cells while leaving a normal amount of B cells. The loss of these essential lymphocytes cause a person to become highly susceptible to infection; moreover, usually JAK3 inhibitors are used by people with an autoimmune disease, who are already at a greater risk for infection.

The US Food and Drug Administration (FDA) requires a boxed warning for the JAK inhibitors tofacitinib, baricitinib, and upadacitinib to warn about the risks of serious heart-related events, cancer, blood clots, and death.

The Pharmacovigilance Risk Assessment Committee of the European Medicines Agency (EMA) recommends that the Janus kinase inhibitors abrocitinib, filgotinib, baricitinib, upadacitinib, and tofacitinib should be used in the following people only if no suitable alternative treatments are available: those aged 65 years or above, those at increased risk of major cardiovascular problems (such as heart attack or stroke), those who smoke or have done so for a long time in the past, and those at increased risk of cancer. The committee also recommends using JAK inhibitors with caution in people with risk factors for blood clots in the lungs and in deep veins (venous thromboembolism (VTE)) other than those listed above.

Patients of all ages treated with Janus kinase inhibitors are at higher risk of Varicella zoster virus (VZV) infection. Several guidelines suggest investigating patients' vaccination status before starting any treatment and performing vaccinations against Vaccine-preventable disease when required. Nevertheless, a low vaccination rate of Herpes zoster vaccine was found among cohorts of patients with IBD, despite a generally positive attitude towards vaccinations.

The special warnings by FDA and EMA are important for shared-decision making with the patient.

== Mechanism of action ==
Janus kinase inhibitors can be classed in several overlapping classes: they are immunomodulators, they are DMARDs (disease-modifying antirheumatic drugs), and they are a subclass of tyrosine kinase inhibitors. They work by modifying the immune system via cytokine activity inhibition.

Cytokines play key roles in controlling cell growth and the immune response. Many cytokines function by binding to and activating type I cytokine receptors and type II cytokine receptors. These receptors in turn rely on the Janus kinase (JAK) family of enzymes for signal transduction. Hence drugs that inhibit the activity of these Janus kinases block cytokine signaling. JAKs relay signals from more than fifty cytokines, which is what makes them attractive therapeutic targets for autoimmune diseases.

More specifically, Janus kinases phosphorylate activated cytokine receptors. These phosphorylated receptors in turn recruit STAT transcription factors which modulate gene transcription.

The first JAK inhibitor to reach clinical trials was tofacitinib. Tofacitinib is a specific inhibitor of JAK3 (IC_{50} = 2 nM) thereby blocking the activity of IL-2, IL-4, IL-15 and IL-21. Hence T_{h}2 cell differentiation is blocked and therefore tofacitinib is effective in treating allergic diseases. Tofacitinib to a lesser extent also inhibits JAK1 (IC_{50} = 100 nM) and JAK2 (IC_{50} = 20 nM), which in turn blocks IFN-γ and IL-6 signalling and consequently T_{h}1 cell differentiation.

One mechanism (relevant to psoriasis) is that the blocking of Jak-dependent IL-23 reduces IL-17 and the damage it causes.

== Molecule design ==
In September 2021, the U.S. Food and Drug Administration (FDA) approved the first JAK inhibitor, ruxolitinib, to treat a skin condition.

Some JAK1 inhibitors are based on a benzimidazole core.

JAK3 inhibitors target the catalytic ATP-binding site of JAK3 and various moieties have been used to get a stronger affinity and selectivity to the ATP-binding pockets. The base that is often seen in compounds with selectivity for JAK3 is pyrrolopyrimidine, as it binds to the same region of the JAKs as purine of the ATP binds. Another ring system that has been used in JAK3 inhibitor derivatives is 1H-pyrrolo[2,3-b]pyridine, as it mimics the pyrrolopyrimidine scaffold. More information on the structure activity relationship of may be found in the article on JAK3 inhibitors.

== Examples ==
=== Approved compounds ===
| Drug | Brand name | Selectivity | Approval date | Indications | References |
|---|---|---|---|---|---|
| Ruxolitinib (oral) | Jakafi, Jakavi | JAK1, JAK2 | November 2011 (US); July 2012 (EU); July 2014 (Japan) | Primary and secondary myelofibrosis (intermediate or high-risk); Polycythemia vera resistant or intolerant to hydroxyurea; Steroid-refractory acute GVHD; Chronic GVHD (second or third-line therapy) | |
| Tofacitinib | Xeljanz, Xeljanz XR, Jaquinus | JAK1, JAK2, JAK3 | November 2012 (US); March 2013 (Japan); March 2017 (EU) | Moderate-to-severe active rheumatoid arthritis; Active psoriatic arthritis; Active ankylosing spondylitis; Moderate-to-severe active ulcerative colitis; Active polyarticular course juvenile idiopathic arthritis; Indicated in intolerance or inefficacy of TNF inhibitors or DMARDs, or other conventional therapy or biologic agents | |
| Oclacitinib | Apoquel | JAK1 | May 2013 (US) | Pruritus associated with allergic dermatitis in dogs; Atopic dermatitis in dogs | |
| Baricitinib | Olumiant | JAK1, JAK2 | February 2017 (EU); July 2017 (Japan); May 2018 (US) | Moderate-to-severe active rheumatoid arthritis (in inadequate response to TNF inhibitors or DMARDs); Severe COVID-19; Severe alopecia areata; Moderate-to-severe Atopic dermatitis | |
| Peficitinib | Smyraf | JAK1, JAK3 | March 2019 (Japan); January 2020 (South Korea) | Rheumatoid arthritis with inadequate response to standard therapy or DMARDs | |
| Upadacitinib | Rinvoq | JAK1 | August 2019 (US); November 2019 (Japan); December 2019 (EU) | Moderate-to-severe active rheumatoid arthritis; Active psoriatic arthritis; Active ankylosing spondylitis; Moderate-to-severe atopic dermatitis; Moderate-to-severe active ulcerative colitis; Active non-radiographic axial spondyloarthritis; Indicated in intolerance or inefficacy of TNF inhibitors or DMARDs, or other conventional therapy or biologic agents | |
| Fedratinib | Inrebic | JAK2 | August 2019 (US); February 2021 (EU) | Primary and secondary myelofibrosis (intermediate-2 or high-risk) | |
| Delgocitinib (topical) | Corectim | Non-selective | January 2020 (Japan) | Atopic dermatitis | |
| Filgotinib | Jyseleca | JAK1 | September 2020 (EU, Japan) | Moderate-to-severe active rheumatoid arthritis; Moderate-to-severe active ulcerative colitis; Indicated in intolerance or inefficacy of DMARDs or conventional therapy | |
| Abrocitinib | Cibinqo | JAK1 | September 2021 (Japan); December 2021 (EU); January 2022 (US) | Refractory moderate-to-severe atopic dermatitis with inadequate response to other systemic therapy | |
| Ruxolitinib (topical) | Opzelura | JAK1, JAK2 | September 2021 (US) | Moderate-to-severe atopic dermatitis (not as a first-line therapy); Nonsegmental vitiligo | |
| Pacritinib | Vonjo | JAK2 | February 2022 (US) | Primary and secondary myelofibrosis (intermediate or high-risk) with thrombocytopenia | |
| Deucravacitinib | Sotyktu | TYK2 | September 2022 (US) | Moderate-to-severe plaque psoriasis | |
| Ritlecitinib | Litfulo | JAK3 | June 2023 (US) | Severe alopecia areata | |
| Momelotinib | Ojjaara | JAK1, JAK2 | September 2023 (US) | Intermediate- or high-risk myelofibrosis in adults with anemia | |
| Golidocitinib | Gao Ruizhe (高瑞哲) | JAK1 | June 2024 (China) | Peripheral T-cell lymphoma | |
| Deuruxolitinib | Leqselvi | JAK1, JAK2 | July 2024 (US) | Severe alopecia areata | |
| Ilunocitinib | Zenrelia | JAK1 | September 2024 (US) | Canine Atopic Dermatitis and Canine Allergic Dermatitis | |

=== In clinical trials ===
- Brepocitinib (PF-06700841), dual JAK1/TYK2 inhibitor for plaque psoriasis.
- Cerdulatinib (PRT062070) dual SYK/JAK inhibitor for hematological malignancies.
- Decernotinib (VX-509), effective in clinical trials against rheumatoid arthritis but failed to show advantages over related compounds.
- Izencitinib (TD-1473), gut selective pan-JAK inhibitor for inflammatory bowel disease.
- Gandotinib (LY-2784544) against JAK2 for myeloproliferative neoplasms.
- Gusacitinib (ASN002), dual JAK/SYK inhibitor in clinical trials for eczema.
- Lestaurtinib (CEP-701) against JAK2 for acute myeloid leukemia (AML).
- Povorcitinib (INCB054707), JAK1 inhibitor in clinical trials for hidradenitis suppurativa and chronic prurigo.
- Ropsacitinib (PF-06826647), selective TYK2 inhibitor for plaque psoriasis.
- Zasocitinib (TAK-279), TYK2 inhibitor for the treatment of psoriatic arthritis.
- Zemprocitinib (LNK-207), selective JAK1 inhibitor for the treatment of ankylosing spondylitis and rheumatoid arthritis.

=== Experimental drugs/indications ===
- Cucurbitacin I (JSI-124).
- CHZ868 — a type II JAK2 inhibitor for use in myeloproliferative disorders and chronic myelomonocytic leukemia (CMML).
- Tofacitinib for alopecia universalis.
- Topical tofacitinib and ruxolitinib for alopecia.
- VVD-118313, selective JAK1 allosteric inhibitor.
- Z583, a JAK3 selective inhibitor, was developed in 2022. JAK3 only regulates certain gamma c cytokines, and Z583 completely inhibited gamma c signaling and blocked the development of inflammatory response.
