= Gusacitinib =

Chemical compound

Identifiers
- IUPAC name: 2-[1-[4-[4-(4-hydroxypiperidin-1-yl)anilino]-5-oxo-6H-pyrimido[4,5-d]pyridazin-2-yl]piperidin-4-yl]acetonitrile
- CAS Number: 1425381-60-7
- PubChem CID: 71269142
- DrugBank: DB15670
- ChemSpider: 71117451
- UNII: 4801QYW816
- KEGG: D11676
- ChEMBL: ChEMBL4594275

Chemical and physical data
- Formula: C_{24}H_{28}N_{8}O_{2}
- Molar mass: 460.542 g·mol^{−1}
- 3D model (JSmol): Interactive image
- SMILES: C1CN(CCC1CC#N)C2=NC3=C(C(=O)NN=C3)C(=N2)NC4=CC=C(C=C4)N5CCC(CC5)O
- InChI: InChI=1S/C24H28N8O2/c25-10-5-16-6-11-32(12-7-16)24-28-20-15-26-30-23(34)21(20)22(29-24)27-17-1-3-18(4-2-17)31-13-8-19(33)9-14-31/h1-4,15-16,19,33H,5-9,11-14H2,(H,30,34)(H,27,28,29); Key:NLFLXLJXEIUQDL-UHFFFAOYSA-N

Gusacitinib (ASN002) is an investigational drug which acts as a pan-Janus kinase inhibitor, binding with similar affinity at JAK1, JAK2, JAK3 and TYK2, and also inhibiting spleen tyrosine kinase (SYK). It is taken orally and was developed for the treatment of eczema and dermatitis.

Gusacitinib was an outcome of Aurigene's Collaboration Programs with Endo Pharmaceuticals.

== See also ==
- Delgocitinib
- Izencitinib
- Tofacitinib
