= CHZ868 =

Chemical compound

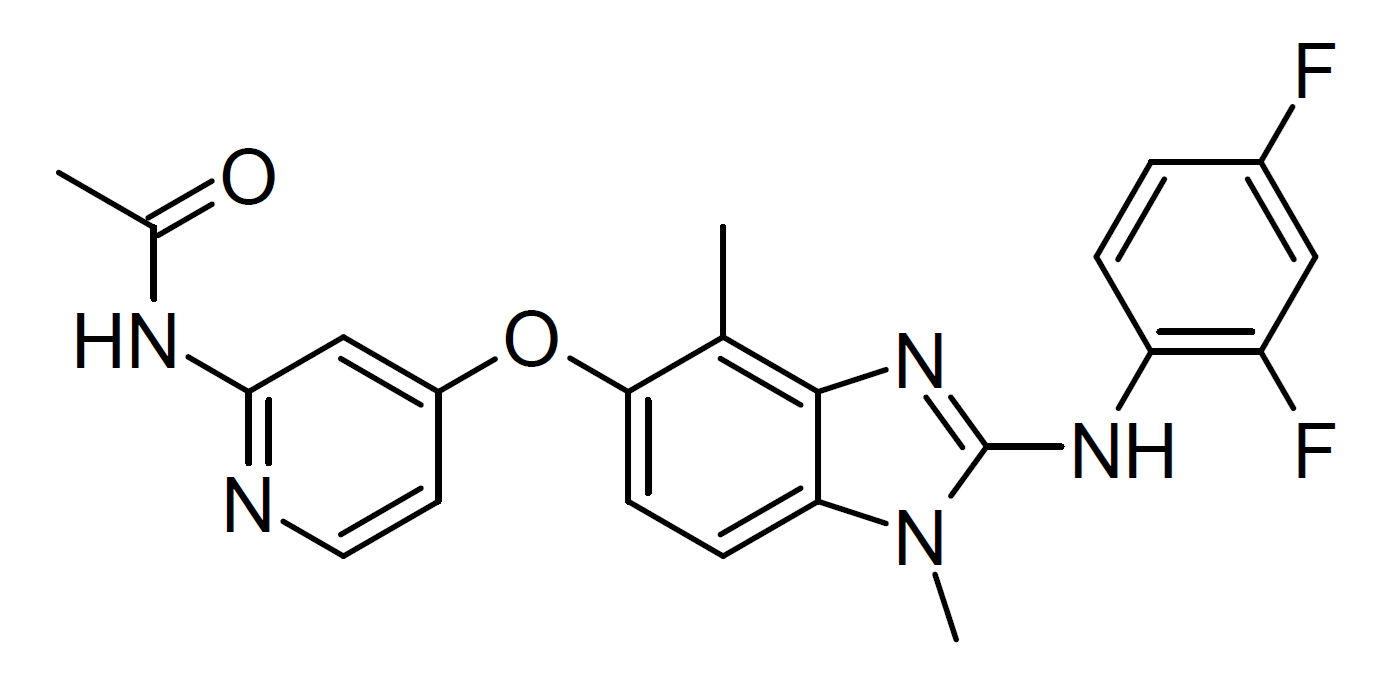

Identifiers
- IUPAC name: N-[4-[2-(2,4-difluoroanilino)-1,4-dimethylbenzimidazol-5-yl]oxypyridin-2-yl]acetamide
- CAS Number: 1895895-38-1
- PubChem CID: 91885989
- ChemSpider: 57876249
- ChEBI: CHEBI:90828

Chemical and physical data
- Formula: C_{22}H_{19}F_{2}N_{5}O_{2}
- Molar mass: 423.424 g·mol^{−1}
- 3D model (JSmol): Interactive image
- SMILES: CC1=C(C=CC2=C1N=C(N2C)NC3=C(C=C(C=C3)F)F)OC4=CC(=NC=C4)NC(=O)C
- InChI: InChI=1S/C22H19F2N5O2/c1-12-19(31-15-8-9-25-20(11-15)26-13(2)30)7-6-18-21(12)28-22(29(18)3)27-17-5-4-14(23)10-16(17)24/h4-11H,1-3H3,(H,27,28)(H,25,26,30); Key:KQQLBXFPTDVFAJ-UHFFFAOYSA-N

CHZ868 is a drug which acts as a Janus kinase inhibitor selective for the JAK2 subtype. It was one of the first Janus kinase inhibitors developed, originally for the treatment of leukemia and related blood cancers, and while it did not get approved for clinical use, it is still used for research in the area.

== See also ==
- Fedratinib
- Pacritinib
