= Ropsacitinib =

Chemical compound

Identifiers
- IUPAC name: 3-(cyanomethyl)-3-[4-[6-(1-methylpyrazol-4-yl)pyrazolo[1,5-a]pyrazin-4-yl]pyrazol-1-yl]cyclobutane-1-carbonitrile
- CAS Number: 2127109-84-4
- PubChem CID: 130339268
- DrugBank: DB18709
- ChemSpider: ID78317711
- UNII: HY5SOV7O0Q
- ChEMBL: ChEMBL4459585

Chemical and physical data
- Formula: C_{20}H_{17}N_{9}
- Molar mass: 383.419 g·mol^{−1}
- 3D model (JSmol): Interactive image
- SMILES: CN1C=C(C=N1)C2=CN3C(=CC=N3)C(=N2)C4=CN(N=C4)C5(CC(C5)C#N)CC#N
- InChI: InChI=1S/C20H17N9/c1-27-11-15(9-24-27)17-13-28-18(2-5-23-28)19(26-17)16-10-25-29(12-16)20(3-4-21)6-14(7-20)8-22/h2,5,9-14H,3,6-7H2,1H3; Key:XPLZTJWZDBFWDE-UHFFFAOYSA-N

Ropsacitinib (PF-06826647) is a drug which is an orally active, selective tyrosine kinase 2 (TYK2) inhibitor. It has been researched for various autoimmune inflammatory conditions, primarily plaque psoriasis.

== See also ==
- Brepocitinib
- Deucravacitinib
