= Z583 =

Chemical compound

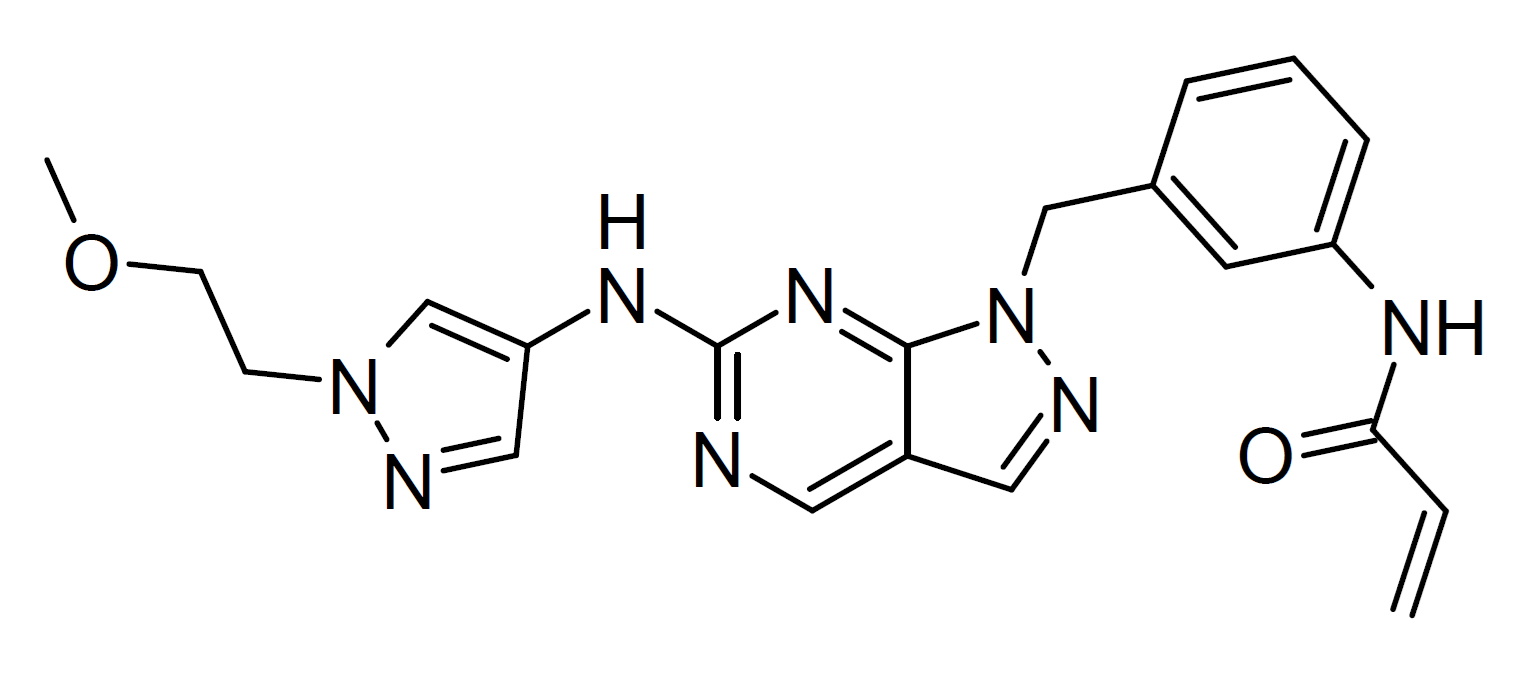

Identifiers
- IUPAC name: N-[3-[[6-[[1-(2-methoxyethyl)pyrazol-4-yl]amino]pyrazolo[3,4-d]pyrimidin-1-yl]methyl]phenyl]prop-2-enamide
- CAS Number: 2412569-41-4
- PubChem CID: 146478990

Chemical and physical data
- Formula: C_{21}H_{22}N_{8}O_{2}
- Molar mass: 418.461 g·mol^{−1}
- 3D model (JSmol): Interactive image
- SMILES: COCCN1C=C(C=N1)NC2=NC=C3C=NN(C3=N2)CC4=CC(=CC=C4)NC(=O)C=C
- InChI: InChI=1S/C21H22N8O2/c1-3-19(30)25-17-6-4-5-15(9-17)13-29-20-16(11-24-29)10-22-21(27-20)26-18-12-23-28(14-18)7-8-31-2/h3-6,9-12,14H,1,7-8,13H2,2H3,(H,25,30)(H,22,26,27); Key:BOBFKXIKGHTPJB-UHFFFAOYSA-N

Z583 (GLXC-26150) is a chemical compound which acts as a potent and highly selective inhibitor of JAK3, and was developed for the treatment of rheumatoid arthritis.

== See also ==
- Ritlecitinib
- Tofacitinib
