= Baricitinib =

Chemical compound

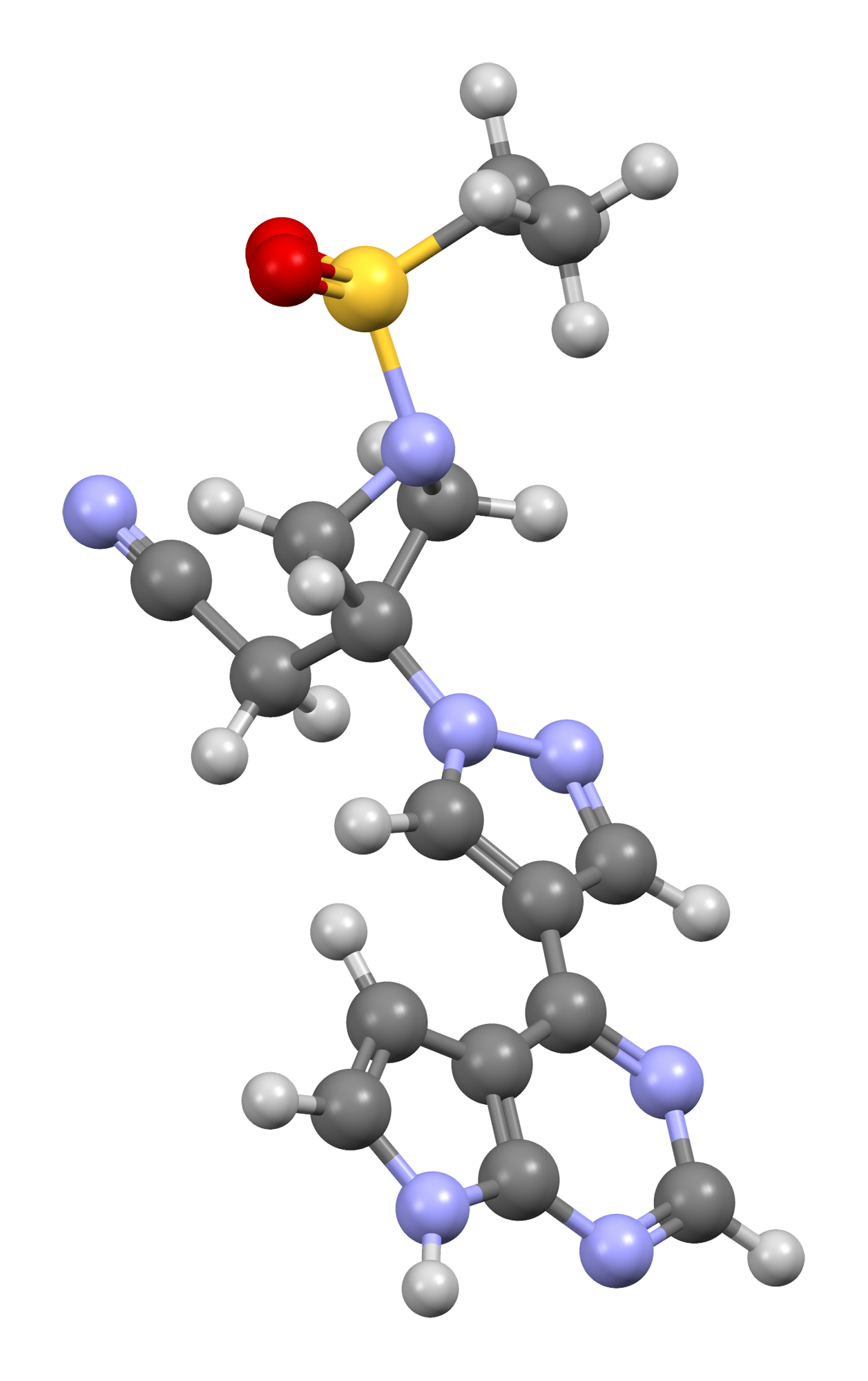

Clinical data
- Pronunciation: /ˌbærɪˈsaɪtɪnɪb/ BAR-i-SYE-ti-nib
- Trade names: Olumiant, others
- Other names: INCB28050, LY3009104
- AHFS/Drugs.com: Monograph
- MedlinePlus: a618033
- License data: US DailyMed: Baricitinib
- Pregnancy category: AU: D; Use is contraindicated
- Routes of administration: By mouth
- ATC code: L04AF02 (WHO)

Legal status
- Legal status: AU: S4 (Prescription only); CA: ℞-only; US: ℞-only; EU: Rx-only; In general: ℞ (Prescription only)

Pharmacokinetic data
- Bioavailability: 79%
- Protein binding: 50%
- Metabolism: CYP3A4 (<10%)
- Elimination half-life: 12.5 hours
- Excretion: 75% urine, 20% faeces

Identifiers
- IUPAC name: 2-{1-(ethylsulfonyl)-3-[4-(7''H''-pyrrolo[2,3-''d'']pyrimidin-4-yl)-1''H''-pyrazol-1-yl]azetidin-3-yl}acetonitrile
- CAS Number: 1187594-09-7
- PubChem CID: 44205240
- DrugBank: DB11817
- ChemSpider: 26373084
- UNII: ISP4442I3Y
- KEGG: D10308
- ChEBI: CHEBI:95341
- ChEMBL: ChEMBL2105759
- PDB ligand: 3JW (PDBe, RCSB PDB)
- CompTox Dashboard (EPA): DTXSID30152228
- ECHA InfoCard: 100.219.080

Chemical and physical data
- Formula: C_{16}H_{17}N_{7}O_{2}S
- Molar mass: 371.42 g·mol^{−1}
- 3D model (JSmol): Interactive image
- SMILES: CCS(=O)(=O)N1CC(CC#N)(n2cc(-c3ncnc4[nH]ccc34)cn2)C1
- InChI: InChI=1S/C16H17N7O2S/c1-2-26(24,25)22-9-16(10-22,4-5-17)23-8-12(7-21-23)14-13-3-6-18-15(13)20-11-19-14/h3,6-8,11H,2,4,9-10H2,1H3,(H,18,19,20); Key:XUZMWHLSFXCVMG-UHFFFAOYSA-N

Baricitinib, sold under the brand name Olumiant among others, is an immunomodulatory medication used for the treatment of rheumatoid arthritis, alopecia areata, and COVID-19. It acts as an inhibitor of janus kinase (JAK), blocking the subtypes JAK1 and JAK2.

Baricitinib is approved for medical use in the European Union and in the United States.

== Medical uses ==
In February 2017, baricitinib was approved for use in the European Union as a second-line therapy for moderate to severe active rheumatoid arthritis in adults, either alone or in combination with methotrexate.

In May 2018, the US Food and Drug Administration (FDA) approved baricitinib for the treatment of adults with moderately to severely active rheumatoid arthritis who have had an inadequate response to one or more TNF antagonist therapies.

In May 2022, the US FDA approved baricitinib for the treatment of COVID-19 in hospitalized adults requiring supplemental oxygen, non-invasive or invasive mechanical ventilation, or extracorporeal membrane oxygenation (ECMO). Baricitinib is the first immunomodulatory treatment for COVID-19 to receive FDA approval. Prior to full approval, the FDA had previously authorized baricitinib under an emergency use authorization (EUA) on November 19, 2020, for the treatment of COVID-19 in hospitalized people aged 2 to less than 18 years of age who require supplemental oxygen, non-invasive or invasive mechanical ventilation, or extracorporeal membrane oxygenation.

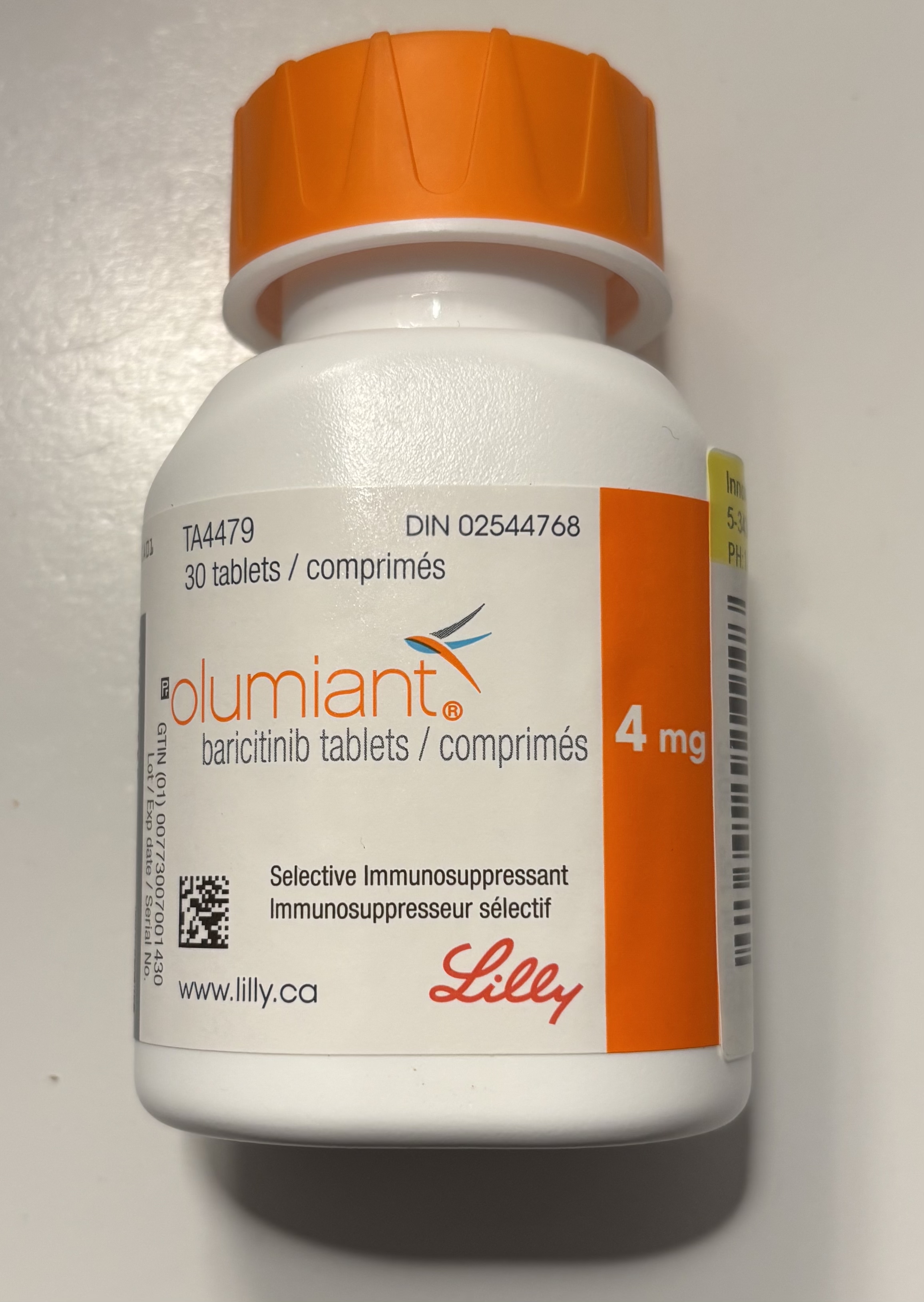
This is a container of 30 4mg tablets of Olumiant barcitinib. As of February 2025, it can only be obtained in Canada to treat alopecia areata through a patient support program with Lilly.

In June 2022, the FDA authorized baricitinib for the treatment of severe alopecia areata.

== Contraindications ==
During pregnancy, the use of baricitinib is contraindicated.

== Side effects ==
In studies, upper respiratory tract infections and high blood cholesterol levels (hypercholesterolemia) occurred in more than 10% of participants. Less common side effects included other infections such as herpes zoster, herpes simplex, urinary tract infections, and gastroenteritis.

== Interactions ==
Being metabolized only to a small extent, the substance has a low potential for interactions. In studies, inhibitors of the liver enzymes CYP3A4, CYP2C19, and CYP2C9, as well as the CYP3A4 inducer rifampicin, had no relevant influence on baricitinib concentrations in the bloodstream. While baricitinib blocks a number of transporter proteins in vitro, clinically relevant interactions via this mechanism are considered very unlikely, except perhaps for the cation transporter SLC22A1 (OCT1).

An additive effect with other immunosuppressants cannot be excluded.

== Pharmacology ==
=== Mechanism of action ===
Baricitinib is a Janus kinase (JAK) inhibitor that reversibly inhibits Janus kinase 1 with a half maximal inhibitory concentration (IC_{50}) of 5.9 nM and Janus kinase 2 with an IC_{50} of 5.7 nM. Tyrosine kinase 2, which belongs to the same enzyme family, is affected less (IC_{50} = 53 nM), and Janus kinase 3 far less (IC_{50} > 400 nM). Via a signal transduction pathway involving STAT proteins, this ultimately modulates gene expression in immunological cells.

Other JAK inhibitors include tofacitinib, which is indicated for the treatment of rheumatoid arthritis, psoriatic arthritis, and ulcerative colitis; fedratinib, and ruxolitinib.

=== Pharmacokinetics ===
The substance is quickly absorbed from the gut with an absolute bioavailability of 79%. It reaches highest blood plasma levels after about an hour; in different individuals the time to reach this level ranges from 0.5 to 3 hours. Food intake has no relevant influence on the drug's pharmacokinetics. 50% of the circulating baricitinib are bound to blood plasma proteins.

Less than 10% of the substance is metabolized to four different oxidation products by CYP3A4; the rest is left unchanged. Elimination half-life is 12.5 hours on average. About 75% is eliminated via the urine, and 20% via the faeces.

== History ==
Baricitinib was discovered by Incyte and licensed to Eli Lilly.

== Society and culture ==
=== Legal status ===
In January 2016, Eli Lilly submitted a new drug application to the US Food and Drug Administration (FDA) for the approval of baricitinib to treat moderately-to-severely active rheumatoid arthritis.

In December 2016, the Committee for Medicinal Products for Human Use (CHMP) of the European Medicines Agency (EMA) recommended the approval of baricitinib as a therapy for rheumatoid arthritis. European Union approval was granted in February 2017.

Despite widespread expectations that the FDA would approve baricitinib for rheumatoid arthritis, in April 2017, the FDA issued a rejection, citing concerns about dosing and safety.

In May 2018, baricitinib was approved in the United States for the treatment of rheumatoid arthritis.

In March 2020, the US FDA granted breakthrough therapy designation to baricitinib for the treatment of alopecia areata and granted approval in June 2022.

The efficacy and safety of baricitinib in alopecia areata was studied in two randomized, double-blind, placebo-controlled trials (Trial AA-1 and Trial AA-2) with participants who had at least 50% scalp hair loss as measured by the Severity of Alopecia Tool (SALT) for more than six months. Participants in these trials received either a placebo, 2 milligrams of baricitinib, or 4 milligrams of baricitinib every day. The primary measurement of efficacy for both trials was the proportion of participants who achieved at least 80% scalp hair coverage at week 36.

== Research ==
As of August 2016, 31 clinical trials had been registered for baricitinib of which 24 had completed, and 4 of 6 phase 3 trials had completed.

=== Alopecia areata ===
As of March 2022, a phase III clinical trial showed hair regrowth for those with alopecia areata.

=== COVID-19 ===
In April 2020, Lilly announced they were investigating the use of baricitinib for treating people with COVID-19. The drug's anti-inflammatory activity was expected to act on the inflammatory cascade associated with COVID-19.

In April and June 2020, the first two studies of baricitinib prescribed for hospitalized people with COVID-19 were published online. Then in November 2020, published research showed baricitinib was beneficial in treating people with COVID-19. According to the paper "mechanistic actions of a Janus kinase-1/2 inhibitor targeting viral entry, replication and the cytokine storm, and is associated with beneficial outcomes including in severely ill elderly people".

In a clinical trial of hospitalized people with COVID-19, baricitinib, in combination with remdesivir, was shown to reduce time to recovery within 29 days after initiating treatment compared to participants who received a placebo with remdesivir.

The data supporting the US Food and Drug Administration (FDA) emergency use authorization (EUA) for baricitinib combined with remdesivir was based on a randomized, double-blind, placebo-controlled clinical trial (ACTT-2), which was conducted by the US National Institute of Allergy and Infectious Diseases (NIAID). This clinical trial evaluated whether baricitinib impacted how long it took for subjects who were also taking remdesivir to recover from COVID-19. The trial followed participants for 29 days and included 1,033 participants with moderate or severe COVID-19; 515 participants received baricitinib plus remdesivir, and 518 participants received placebo plus remdesivir. Recovery was defined as either being discharged from the hospital or being hospitalized but not requiring supplemental oxygen and no longer requiring ongoing medical care. The median time to recovery from COVID-19 was seven days for baricitinib plus remdesivir and eight days for placebo plus remdesivir. The odds of a patient's condition progressing to death or being ventilated at day 29 was 31% lower in the baricitinib plus remdesivir group versus the placebo plus remdesivir group. The odds of clinical improvement at day 15 was 30% higher in the baricitinib plus remdesivir group versus the placebo plus remdesivir group. For all of these endpoints, the effects were statistically significant. The EUA was issued to Eli Lilly and Company.

In November 2020, the World Health Organization (WHO) updated its guideline on therapeutics for COVID-19 to include a conditional recommendation against the use of remdesivir, triggered by results from the WHO Solidarity trial.

In November 2020, the FDA issued an emergency use authorization (EUA) for the combination of baricitinib with remdesivir, for the treatment of suspected or laboratory confirmed COVID-19 in hospitalized people aged two years of age or older requiring supplemental oxygen, invasive mechanical ventilation, or extracorporeal membrane oxygenation (ECMO).

Then in September 2021, the largest randomized, placebo-controlled trial of hospitalized people with COVID-19 to date, COV-BARRIER, was published. This trial randomized 1525 participants to either baricitinib or placebo. Nearly 80% of participants were receiving systemic corticosteroids at enrollment. There was an absolute risk reduction of 2.7 percent in the primary endpoint of progression to high-flow oxygen, non-invasive ventilation, invasive mechanical ventilation, or death by day 28. The 38.2% statistically significant reduction in all-cause 28-day mortality for participants receiving baricitinib compared to placebo was the largest mortality reduction to date and maintained at 60 days. This translates into one additional death prevented for every 20 participants treated with baricitinib. The frequencies of serious adverse events were lower for participants receiving baricitinib compared to those receiving placebo.

As of April 2021, the Committee for Medicinal Products for Human Use (CHMP) of the European Medicines Agency (EMA) is evaluating the use of baricitinib to include treatment of COVID-19 in hospitalized people from ten years of age who require supplemental oxygen.

In July 2021, the FDA revised the EUA for baricitinib authorizing it alone for the treatment of COVID-19 in hospitalized people aged two years of age or older requiring supplemental oxygen, non-invasive or invasive mechanical ventilation, or extracorporeal membrane oxygenation (ECMO). Under the revised EUA, baricitinib is not required to be administered with remdesivir.

As of January 2022, the World Health Organization recommends baricitinib for people with severe or critical COVID-19. Thereafter in February 2022, an exploratory randomized, placebo-controlled trial of participants receiving invasive mechanical ventilation or extracorporeal membrane oxygenation were randomly to baricitinib or placebo. There was a 46% statistically significant relative reduction in all-cause mortality for participants receiving baricitinib compared to those receiving placebo at 28 days which was sustained at 60 days.

In March 2022, the RECOVERY trial reported that the use of baricitinib cut the risk of death by about a fifth in about 12,000 participants.

Then in May 2022, the FDA approved use of baricitinib for the treatment of adults hospitalized with COVID-19 who require supplemental oxygen, non-invasive or invasive mechanical ventilation, or extracorporeal membrane oxygenation with a recommended dose of 4 mg once daily for 14 days or until hospital discharge, whichever happens first.

=== HIV/AIDS ===
Baricitinib has been investigated for its potential to reduce the HIV reservoir and chronic inflammation in people infected with HIV. Preclinical studies in humanized mice and non-human primates have demonstrated that the drug can penetrate the blood-brain barrier and reach therapeutic concentrations in the central nervous system (CNS). In these models, baricitinib was associated with a reduction in cellular activation markers, lower frequencies of infected macrophages in the brain, and improvements in HIV-associated behavioral deficits. Research suggests that by blocking the JAK-STAT signaling pathway, the drug may limit the survival of infected cells and prevent the reseeding of viral reservoirs in sanctuary sites like the CNS, which are often poorly reached by standard antiretroviral therapy (ART).

As of 2025, baricitinib is currently being evaluated in multiple Phase II clinical trials to assess its safety and efficacy as an adjunctive therapy to ART. One primary area of focus is its ability to decrease or clear the CNS reservoir, with ongoing trials monitoring changes in cerebrospinal fluid (CSF) viral DNA and neurocognitive function. Additional studies are examining its impact on systemic inflammation, cell survival pathways, and the delay of viral rebound during monitored treatment interruptions.
