= Oclacitinib =

Medication

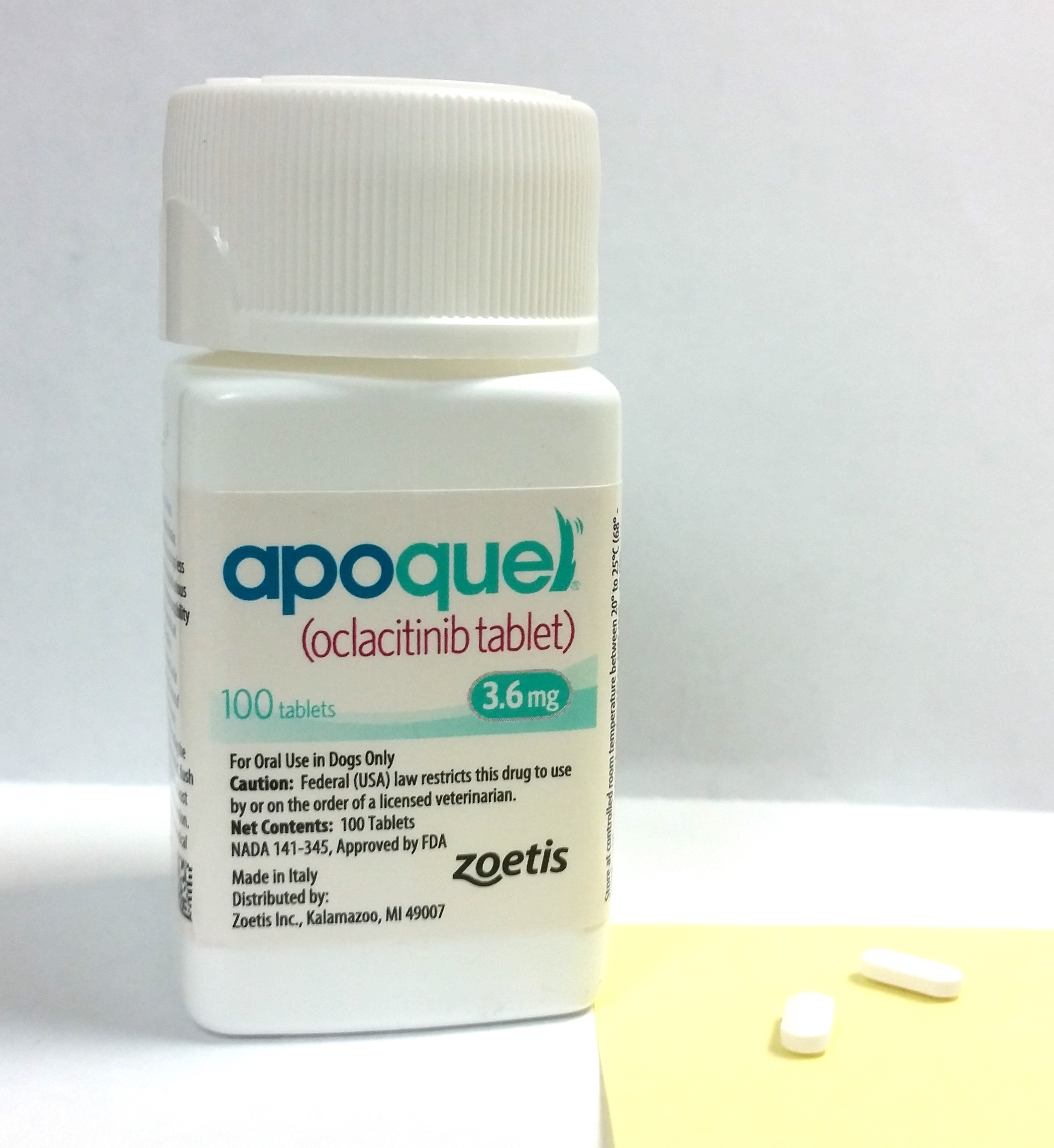

Clinical data
- Trade names: Apoquel
- Other names: PF-03394197
- AHFS/Drugs.com: Veterinary Use
- Routes of administration: By mouth
- Drug class: JAK inhibitor
- ATCvet code: QD11AH90 (WHO)

Legal status
- Legal status: CA: ℞-only; US: ℞-only; EU: Rx-only; In general: ℞ (Prescription only)

Pharmacokinetic data
- Bioavailability: 89%
- Protein binding: 66.3–69.7%
- Metabolism: Liver
- Elimination half-life: 3.1–5.2 hours
- Excretion: Mostly liver

Identifiers
- IUPAC name: N-methyl{trans-4-[(methyl)(7H-pyrrolo[2,3-d]pyrimidin-4-yl)amino]cyclohexyl}methanesulfonamide
- CAS Number: 1208319-26-9
- PubChem CID: 44631938
- ChemSpider: 28528036
- UNII: 99GS5XTB51
- KEGG: D10141
- ChEMBL: ChEMBL2103874
- CompTox Dashboard (EPA): DTXSID501016299

Chemical and physical data
- Formula: C_{15}H_{23}N_{5}O_{2}S
- Molar mass: 337.44 g·mol^{−1}
- 3D model (JSmol): Interactive image
- SMILES: CNS(=O)(=O)C[C@@H]1CC[C@H](CC1)N(C)c2[nH]cnc3nccc23
- InChI: InChI=1S/C15H23N5O2S/c1-16-23(21,22)9-11-3-5-12(6-4-11)20(2)15-13-7-8-17-14(13)18-10-19-15/h7-8,10-12,16H,3-6,9H2,1-2H3,(H,17,18,19)/t11-,12-; Key:HJWLJNBZVZDLAQ-HAQNSBGRSA-N

Oclacitinib, sold under the brand name Apoquel among others, is a veterinary medication used in the control of atopic dermatitis and pruritus from allergic dermatitis in dogs at least 12 months of age. Chemically, it is a synthetic cyclohexylamino-pyrrolopyrimidine Janus kinase inhibitor (JAK inhibitor) that is relatively selective for JAK1. It inhibits signal transduction when the JAK is activated and thereby helps downregulate expression of inflammatory cytokine.

Oclacitinib was approved for use in the United States in 2013 and in the European Union in 2023. A flavored chewable form was approved for use in the United States in 2023.

== Uses ==
Oclacitinib is labeled to treat atopic dermatitis and itchiness (pruritus) caused by allergies in dogs, though it has also been used to reduce the itchiness and dermatitis caused by flea infestations. While some say it is best only for acute flares of itchiness, others claim that it is also useful in chronic atopic dermatitis. It is considered to be highly effective in dogs and has been established as safe for at least short-term use. Its efficacy is comparable to prednisolone early in treatment, and although oclacitinib has been shown to be more effective in the short term for itchiness and dermatitis, its long-term safety is incompletely established. It has been found to have a faster onset and cause less gastrointestinal issues than cyclosporine. There is some off-label use of oclacitinib to treat asthma and allergic dermatitis in cats, but its efficacy has not been established.

== Contraindications ==
Oclacitinib is not labeled for use in dogs younger than one year due to reports of it causing demodicosis. It should also be avoided in dogs less than 3 kg (6.6 lb). Most of the other contraindications are avoiding cases where a potential side effect exacerbates a pre-existing condition: for example, because oclacitinib can cause lumps or tumors, it should not be used in dogs with cancer or a history of it; because it is an immune system suppressant, it should not be used in dogs with serious infections.

Oclacitinib, by virtue of its low plasma protein binding, has little chance of reacting with other drugs. Nonetheless, concurrent use of steroids and oclacitinib has not been tested and is thus not recommended.

== Side effects ==
Oclacitinib lacks the side effects that most JAK inhibitors have in humans; instead, side effects are infrequent, mild, and mostly self-limiting. The most common side effects are gastrointestinal problems (vomiting, diarrhea, and appetite loss) and lethargy. The GI problems can sometimes be alleviated by giving oclacitinib with food. New cutaneous or subcutaneous lumps, such as papillomas, can appear, and dogs face an increased susceptibility to infections such as demodicosis. There is a transient decrease in neutrophils, eosinophils, and monocytes, as well as in serum globulin, while cholesterol and lipase levels increase. The decrease in white blood cells lasts only around 14 days. None of the increases or decreases are clinically significant (i.e. none push their corresponding values out of normal ranges).

Less common side effects of oclacitinib include bloody diarrhea; pneumonia; infections of the skin, ear, and/or urinary tract; and histiocytomas (benign tumors). Increases in appetite, aggression, and thirst have also been reported.

== Pharmacodynamics ==
=== Mechanism of action ===
Oclacitinib is not a corticosteroid or antihistamine, but rather modulates the production of signal molecules called cytokines in some cells. Normally, a cytokine binds to a JAK (Janus kinase) receptor, driving the two individual chains to come together and self-phosphorylate. This brings in STAT proteins, which are activated and then go to the nucleus to increase transcription of genes coding for cytokines, thus increasing cytokine production.

Oclacitinib inhibits signal JAK family members (JAK1, JAK2, JAK3, and tyrosine kinase 2), most effectively JAK1, while not significantly inhibiting non-JAK kinases.

Receptor	Mean IC_{50} (nM)
JAK1	10
JAK2	18
JAK3	99
TYK2	84

This causes the inhibition of pro-inflammatory and pruritogenic (itch-causing) cytokines that depend on JAK1 and JAK3, which include IL-2, IL-4, IL-6, IL-13, and IL-31 (TSLP, another pruritogenic cytokine that uses JAKs, has also been found to be inhibited). IL-31 is a key cytokine at the pruritogenic receptors at neurons near the skin, and also induces peripheral blood mononuclear cells and keratinocytes to release pro-inflammatory cytokines. Suppression of IL-4 and IL-13 causes a decrease of T_{h}2-cell differentiation, which plays a role in atopic dermatitis. Oclacitinib's relatively little effect on JAK2 prevent it from suppressing hematopoiesis or the innate immune response.

Oclacitinib inhibits JAK, not the pruritogenic cytokines themselves; studies in mice showed that suddenly stopping the medication caused an increase in itchiness caused by a rebound effect, where more cytokines were produced to overcome lack of response by JAK.

=== Pharmacokinetics ===
Oclacitinib is absorbed well when taken orally; it takes less than an hour to reach peak plasma concentration and has a bioavailability of 89%. In most dogs, pruritus begins to subside within four hours and is completely gone within 24. Oclacitinib is cleared mostly by being metabolized in the liver, though there is some kidney and bile duct clearance as well.
