= Izencitinib =

Chemical compound

Identifiers
- IUPAC name: 3-[(1R,5S)-3-[[7-[(5-methyl-1H-pyrazol-3-yl)amino]-1,6-naphthyridin-5-yl]amino]-8-azabicyclo[3.2.1]octan-8-yl]propanenitrile
- CAS Number: 2051918-33-1
- PubChem CID: 124090478
- IUPHAR/BPS: 10458
- DrugBank: DB16660
- ChemSpider: 75536963
- UNII: 2ZT81PV5UM
- ChEMBL: ChEMBL4650343

Chemical and physical data
- Formula: C_{22}H_{26}N_{8}
- Molar mass: 402.506 g·mol^{−1}
- 3D model (JSmol): Interactive image
- SMILES: CC1=CC(=NN1)NC2=NC(=C3C=CC=NC3=C2)NC4C[C@H]5CC[C@@H](C4)N5CCC#N
- InChI: InChI=1S/C22H26N8/c1-14-10-21(29-28-14)26-20-13-19-18(4-2-8-24-19)22(27-20)25-15-11-16-5-6-17(12-15)30(16)9-3-7-23/h2,4,8,10,13,15-17H,3,5-6,9,11-12H2,1H3,(H3,25,26,27,28,29)/t15?,16-,17+; Key:DADAEARVGOQWHV-ALOPSCKCSA-N

Izencitinib (TD-1473) is a drug which acts as a pan-Janus kinase inhibitor, binding with high affinity at all three subtypes JAK1, JAK2 and JAK3. It is taken orally and was developed to be gut selective with minimal absorption into the rest of the body, allowing targeting of inflammatory bowel disease but with reduced side effects compared to other similar drugs.

== See also ==
- Delgocitinib
- Tofacitinib
