= C17H18N6 =

The molecular formula C_{17}H_{18}N_{6} may refer to:

- Deuruxolitinib
- Ruxolitinib
