= C24H28N8O2 =

The molecular formula C_{24}H_{28}N_{8}O_{2} may refer to:

- Gusacitinib
- Taselisib
