= Golidocitinib =

Clinical data
- Trade names: 高瑞哲 (Gao Ruizhe)
- Other names: AZD-4205, AZD4205, JAK1-IN-3

Legal status
- Legal status: Rx in China

Identifiers
- IUPAC name: (2R)-N-(3-{2-[(3-methoxy-1-methyl-1H-pyrazol-4-yl)amino]pyrimidin-4-yl}-1H-indol-7-yl)-2-(4-methylpiperazin-1-yl)propanamide
- CAS Number: 2091134-68-6
- PubChem CID: 126715380
- DrugBank: DB18057
- ChemSpider: 71117616
- UNII: 3BY9Z3M34G
- KEGG: D12502
- ChEMBL: ChEMBL4577523

Chemical and physical data
- Formula: C_{25}H_{31}N_{9}O_{2}
- Molar mass: 489.584 g·mol^{−1}
- 3D model (JSmol): Interactive image
- SMILES: COc1nn(C)cc1Nc1nccc(-c2c[nH]c3c(NC(=O)[C@@H](C)N4CCN(C)CC4)cccc23)n1
- InChI: InChI=InChI=1S/C25H31N9O2/c1-16(34-12-10-32(2)11-13-34)23(35)28-20-7-5-6-17-18(14-27-22(17)20)19-8-9-26-25(29-19)30-21-15-33(3)31-24(21)36-4/h5-9,14-16,27H,10-13H2,1-4H3,(H,28,35)(H,26,29,30)/t16-/m1/s1; Key:CVCVOSPZEVINRM-MRXNPFEDSA-N

Golidocitinib is a pharmaceutical drug for the treatment of cancer. In June 2024, it was given conditional approval in China for the treatment of relapsed or refractory peripheral T-cell lymphoma.

Golidocitinib is classified as a Janus kinase inhibitor.
