= Prurigo =

- Specialty: Dermatology

Prurigo is a reactive skin condition distinguished by numerous, isolated itchy papules. The word "prurigo" comes from the Latin word pruire, which meaning itching. Ferdinand von Hebra coined the term "prurigo" in Vienna in 1850 to describe papules and nodules that had severe pruritus. Some authors categorize prurigo based on its nature (acute, subacute, or chronic), clinical manifestation, underlying cause, or related illness.

== Signs and symptoms ==
Prurigo is a reactive cutaneous disorder characterized by prurigo papules or nodules. Isolated papules that itch intensely are called prurigo papules. Scratching can cause erosions to form at the top, although unlike eczematous papules, these typically don't show any noticeable phenotypic alterations. Skin lesions with nodules may appear during development. There are two types of lesions that result from scratching: initial lesions and secondary lesions. Under certain conditions, some prurigo can form aggregates or plaques.

== Causes ==
The impression of itching can also be altered by emotional and environmental variables, which can lead to scratching and the development of a prurigo lesion. Itching can also be brought on by a number of exogenous variables, including bacteria, parasites, allergies applied topically or internally, and poisonous substances deposited beneath the skin. The primary source of itching is a mechanical reflex used to get rid of ectoparasites. In those who are sensitive, physical variables like UV light can cause alterations in epidermal innervation, which can lead to prurigo sores and itching.

Certain endogenous substances, like uric acid in uremia, biliary salts in pregnancy or hepatobiliary cirrhosis, or histamine in atopic patients, can occasionally cause local reactions in the skin that result in prurigo lesions that are identical to the primary lesion of acute, subacute, or chronic prurigo.

== Demographics ==
There are several types of prurigo that are more common in particular ethnic groups.

== See also ==
- Povorcitinib, investigational new drug
- Prurigo nodularis
- Actinic prurigo
- Besnier's prurigo (a specific type of atopic dermatitis).
