= Cadefrecitinib =

Investigational TYK2 inhibitor drug

Clinical data
- Other names: GLPG3667

Identifiers
- IUPAC name: 4-methyl-5-[3-methyl-7-[(6-morpholin-4-ylpyridazin-3-yl)amino]imidazo[4,5-b]pyridin-5-yl]oxypyridine-2-carbonitrile
- CAS Number: 2308520-97-8
- PubChem CID: 138560421
- IUPHAR/BPS: 14047
- UNII: NKX4HH6CWK
- ChEMBL: ChEMBL5558196

Chemical and physical data
- Formula: C_{22}H_{21}N_{9}O_{2}
- Molar mass: 443.471 g·mol^{−1}
- 3D model (JSmol): Interactive image
- SMILES: CC1=CC(=NC=C1OC2=NC3=C(C(=C2)NC4=NN=C(C=C4)N5CCOCC5)N=CN3C)C#N
- InChI: InChI=InChI=1S/C22H21N9O2/c1-14-9-15(11-23)24-12-17(14)33-20-10-16(21-22(27-20)30(2)13-25-21)26-18-3-4-19(29-28-18)31-5-7-32-8-6-31/h3-4,9-10,12-13H,5-8H2,1-2H3,(H,26,27,28); Key:GXELZXDURVDKHP-UHFFFAOYSA-N

Cadefrecitinib is an investigational new drug that is being developed by Lakefront Biotherapeutics for the treatment of dermatomyositis and systemic lupus erythematosus. It is a TYK2 kinase inhibitor.
