= Deuruxolitinib =

Chemical compound

Clinical data
- Trade names: Leqselvi
- Other names: CTP-543
- AHFS/Drugs.com: Monograph
- MedlinePlus: a624047
- License data: US DailyMed: Deuruxolitinib
- Routes of administration: By mouth
- Drug class: Janus kinase inhibitor
- ATC code: None

Legal status
- Legal status: US: ℞-only

Identifiers
- IUPAC name: (3R)-3-(2,2,3,3,4,4,5,5-Octadeuteriocyclopentyl)-3-[4-(7H-pyrrolo[2,3-d]pyrimidin-4-yl)pyrazol-1-yl]propanenitrile
- CAS Number: 1513883-39-0; as phosphate: 2147706-60-1
- PubChem CID: 72704611; as phosphate: 154572727
- DrugBank: DB18847
- ChemSpider: 115010950
- UNII: 0CA0VSF91Y; as phosphate: 8VJ43S4LCM
- KEGG: D11866; as phosphate: D11867
- ChEMBL: ChEMBL4594381

Chemical and physical data
- Formula: C_{17}H_{10}D_{8}N_{6}
- Molar mass: 314.417 g·mol^{−1}
- 3D model (JSmol): Interactive image
- SMILES: [2H]C1([2H])C([C@@H](CC#N)n2cc(-c3ncnc4[nH]ccc34)cn2)C([2H])([2H])C([2H])([2H])C1([2H])[2H]
- InChI: InChI=1S/C17H18N6/c18-7-5-15(12-3-1-2-4-12)23-10-13(9-22-23)16-14-6-8-19-17(14)21-11-20-16/h6,8-12,15H,1-5H2,(H,19,20,21)/t15-/m1/s1/i1D2,2D2,3D2,4D2; Key:HFNKQEVNSGCOJV-FBXGHSCESA-N; Key:JFMWPOCYMYGEDM-NTVOUFPTSA-N

Deuruxolitinib, sold under the brand name Leqselvi, is a medication used for the treatment of alopecia areata. It is a Janus kinase inhibitor selective for JAK1 and JAK2. Although the relative effectiveness of deuruxolitinib and another Janus kinase inhibitor—baricitinib—for alopecia areata may vary depending on the population studied, both drugs are more effective than alternative treatments.

Deuruxolitinib was approved for medical use in the United States in July 2024.

== Medical uses ==
Deuruxolitinib is indicated for the treatment of adults with severe alopecia areata.

== Side effects ==
The FDA prescribing label for deuruxolitinib contains a boxed warning for serious infections; malignancies; cardiovascular death, myocardial infarction, and stroke; and thrombosis.

== Society and culture ==
=== Legal status ===
Deuruxolitinib was approved for medical use in the United States in July 2024.

=== Names ===
Deuruxolitinib is the international nonproprietary name and the United States Adopted Name.
