= VVD-118313 =

Chemical compound

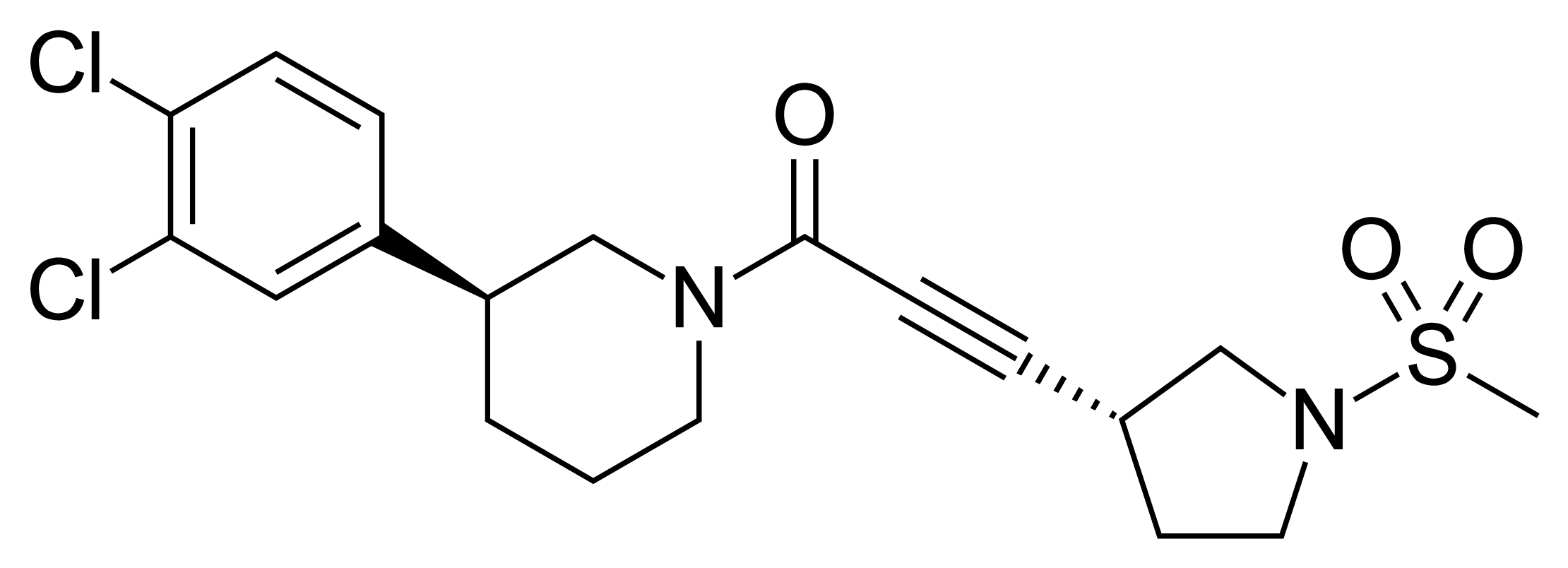

Identifiers
- IUPAC name: 1-[(3S)-3-(3,4-dichlorophenyl)piperidin-1-yl]-3-[(3R)-1-methylsulfonylpyrrolidin-3-yl]prop-2-yn-1-one
- CAS Number: 2875046-27-6
- PubChem CID: 168008613
- ChemSpider: 123963146

Chemical and physical data
- Formula: C_{19}H_{22}Cl_{2}N_{2}O_{3}S
- Molar mass: 429.36 g·mol^{−1}
- 3D model (JSmol): Interactive image
- SMILES: CS(=O)(=O)N1CC[C@@H](C1)C#CC(=O)N2CCC[C@H](C2)C3=CC(=C(C=C3)Cl)Cl
- InChI: InChI=1S/C19H22Cl2N2O3S/c1-27(25,26)23-10-8-14(12-23)4-7-19(24)22-9-2-3-16(13-22)15-5-6-17(20)18(21)11-15/h5-6,11,14,16H,2-3,8-10,12-13H2,1H3/t14-,16+/m0/s1; Key:OUPVMVHXMWBFDP-GOEBONIOSA-N

VVD-118313 is a chemical compound which acts as a potent and selective negative allosteric modulator of JAK1, and was developed for research into the treatment of inflammatory diseases, especially chronic inflammation involved in the development of cancer.

== See also ==
- Deucravacitinib
