= Ilunocitinib =

Veterinary medication

Clinical data
- Pronunciation: /aɪˌlʌnoʊˈsaɪtɪnɪb/ eye-LUN-oh-SYE-ti-nib
- Trade names: Zenrelia
- Other names: LY-3411067
- License data: US DailyMed: Ilunocitinib
- Routes of administration: By mouth
- ATC code: None

Legal status
- Legal status: CA: ℞-only; US: ℞-only

Identifiers
- IUPAC name: 2-(1-(cyclopropanesulfonyl)-3-(4-(7H-pyrrolo[2,3-d]pyrimidin-4-yl)-1H-pyrazol-1-yl)azetidin-3-yl)acetonitrile
- CAS Number: 1187594-14-4
- PubChem CID: 44231134
- IUPHAR/BPS: 11670
- ChemSpider: 115006748
- UNII: N3TB5AH8B9
- ChEMBL: ChEMBL4802241

Chemical and physical data
- Formula: C_{17}H_{17}N_{7}O_{2}S
- Molar mass: 383.43 g·mol^{−1}
- 3D model (JSmol): Interactive image
- SMILES: N#CCC1(n2cc(-c3ncnc4[nH]ccc34)cn2)CN(S(=O)(=O)C2CC2)C1
- InChI: InChI=InChI=1S/C17H17N7O2S/c18-5-4-17(9-23(10-17)27(25,26)13-1-2-13)24-8-12(7-22-24)15-14-3-6-19-16(14)21-11-20-15/h3,6-8,11,13H,1-2,4,9-10H2,(H,19,20,21); Key:RVOUEXFKIYNODQ-UHFFFAOYSA-N

Ilunocitinib, sold under the brand name Zenrelia, is a veterinary medication used for the treatment of pruritus (itching) in dogs. It is a non-selective Janus kinase inhibitor.

Ilunocitinib was approved for medical use in the United States in September 2024, and in it was approved in Canada in December 2024.

== Medical uses ==
Ilunocitinib is indicated for the control of pruritus associated with allergic dermatitis and control of atopic dermatitis in dogs at least twelve months of age.

== Contraindications ==
It is not safe to administer vaccines to dogs that are concurrently receiving ilunocitinib.

== Society and culture ==
=== Legal status ===
Ilunocitinib was approved for medical use in the United States in September 2024, and in Canada in December 2024.

In June 2025, the Committee for Veterinary Medicinal Products of the European Medicines Agency adopted a positive opinion, recommending the granting of a marketing authorization for the veterinary medicinal product Zenrelia, film-coated tablets, intended for dogs. The applicant for this veterinary medicinal product is Elanco GmbH.

=== Names ===
Ilunocitinib is the international nonproprietary name.

Ilunocitinib is sold under the brand name Zenrelia.
