= Gandotinib =

Chemical compound

Clinical data
- Routes of administration: PO
- ATC code: none

Identifiers
- IUPAC name: 3-(4-Chloro-2-fluorobenzyl)-2-methyl-N-(5-methyl-1H-pyrazol-3-yl)-8-(morpholinomethyl)imidazo[1,2-b]pyridazin-6-amine
- CAS Number: 1229236-86-5
- PubChem CID: 46213929
- ChemSpider: 25027412
- UNII: ANC71R916O
- KEGG: D10365
- CompTox Dashboard (EPA): DTXSID20153789

Chemical and physical data
- Formula: C_{23}H_{25}ClFN_{7}O
- Molar mass: 469.95 g·mol^{−1}
- 3D model (JSmol): Interactive image
- SMILES: C12C(=CC(=NN1C(=C(N=2)C)CC1C(=CC(=CC=1)Cl)F)NC1=NNC(=C1)C)CN1CCOCC1
- InChI: InChI=1S/C23H25ClFN7O/c1-14-9-21(29-28-14)27-22-11-17(13-31-5-7-33-8-6-31)23-26-15(2)20(32(23)30-22)10-16-3-4-18(24)12-19(16)25/h3-4,9,11-12H,5-8,10,13H2,1-2H3,(H2,27,28,29,30); Key:SQSZANZGUXWJEA-UHFFFAOYSA-N

Gandotinib (LY-2784544) is an experimental drug developed by Eli Lilly for treatment of cancer. It is a small molecule JAK2 (Janus kinase) inhibitor, with additional minor inhibition of STAT3.

In phase I trial, 16% of patients receiving the drug developed tumor lysis syndrome. A phase II trial is underway for patients with myeloproliferative neoplasms, polycythemia vera, essential thrombocythemia, or myelofibrosis, who had failed ruxolitinib.
