= Brepocitinib =

Chemical compound

Clinical data
- Trade names: Lisraya
- Other names: PF-06700841
- AHFS/Drugs.com: Lisraya
- License data: US DailyMed: Brepocitinib
- Routes of administration: By mouth
- Drug class: Anti-inflammatory
- ATC code: None

Legal status
- Legal status: US: ℞-only

Identifiers
- IUPAC name: ((1S)-2,2-difluorocyclopropyl)[(1R,5S)-3-{2-[(1-methyl-1H-pyrazol-4-yl)amino]pyrimidin-4-yl}-3,8-diazabicyclo[3.2.1]octan-8-yl]methanone
- CAS Number: 1883299-62-4; 2140301-96-6
- PubChem CID: 118878093; 124203834
- DrugBank: DB15003
- ChemSpider: 72380129
- UNII: 3X8387Q25N; C960DPP15O
- KEGG: D11537; D11538
- ChEMBL: ChEMBL4297477
- PDB ligand: G4J (PDBe, RCSB PDB)

Chemical and physical data
- Formula: C_{18}H_{21}F_{2}N_{7}O
- Molar mass: 389.411 g·mol^{−1}
- 3D model (JSmol): Interactive image
- SMILES: Cn1cc(cn1)Nc2nccc(n2)N3C[C@@H]4CC[C@H](C3)N4C(=O)[C@@H]5CC5(F)F
- InChI: InChI=1S/C18H21F2N7O/c1-25-8-11(7-22-25)23-17-21-5-4-15(24-17)26-9-12-2-3-13(10-26)27(12)16(28)14-6-18(14,19)20/h4-5,7-8,12-14H,2-3,6,9-10H2,1H3,(H,21,23,24)/t12-,13+,14-/m0/s1; Key:BUWBRTXGQRBBHG-MJBXVCDLSA-N

Brepocitinib, sold under the brand name Lisraya, is a medication used for the treatment of dermatomyositis. It is a Janus kinase and tyrosine kinase 2 inhibitor. It is taken by mouth.

The most common adverse reactions include upper respiratory tract infection, headache, fatigue, urinary tract infection, and nausea.

Brepocitinib was approved for medical use in the United States in August 2026.

== Medical uses ==
Brepocitinib is indicated for the treatment of dermatomyositis in adults.

Dermatomyositis is a rare autoimmune disease in which the immune system attacks the muscles and skin, causing chronic inflammation, progressive muscle weakness, and distinctive skin rashes.

== History ==
The efficacy and safety of brepocitinib were evaluated in a phase III randomized, double-blind, multi-center, placebo-controlled study (NCT05437263) that included 241 adults with dermatomyositis. Participants were randomized to receive brepocitinib 30 mg once daily, brepocitinib 15 mg once daily or placebo for a 52-week treatment period.

== Society and culture ==
=== Legal status ===
Brepocitinib was approved for medical use in the United States in August 2026. The US Food and Drug Administration (FDA) granted the application for brepocitinib orphan drug and priority review designations. The FDA granted the approval of Lisraya to Priovant Therapeutics.

=== Names ===
Brepocitinib is the international nonproprietary name.

Brepocitinib is sold under the brand name Lisraya.
