= Ritlecitinib =

Medication to treat hair loss

Clinical data
- Trade names: Litfulo
- Other names: PF-06651600
- AHFS/Drugs.com: Monograph
- MedlinePlus: a624015
- License data: US DailyMed: Ritlecitinib
- Pregnancy category: AU: D
- Routes of administration: By mouth
- ATC code: L04AF08 (WHO)

Legal status
- Legal status: AU: S4 (Prescription only); CA: ℞-only; US: ℞-only; EU: Rx-only

Identifiers
- IUPAC name: 1-{(2S,5R)-2-methyl-5-[(7H-pyrrolo[2,3-d]pyrimidin-4-yl)amino]piperidin-1-yl}prop-2-en-1-one
- CAS Number: 1792180-81-4; as salt: 2192215-81-7
- PubChem CID: 118115473
- IUPHAR/BPS: 9559
- DrugBank: DB14924; as salt: DBSALT003482
- ChemSpider: 59718512; as salt: 81368003
- UNII: 2OYE00PC25; as salt: EAG4T1459K
- KEGG: as salt: D11970
- ChEBI: CHEBI:229233
- ChEMBL: ChEMBL4085457

Chemical and physical data
- Formula: C_{15}H_{19}N_{5}O
- Molar mass: 285.351 g·mol^{−1}
- 3D model (JSmol): Interactive image
- SMILES: C=CC(=O)N1C[C@H](Nc2ncnc3[nH]ccc23)CC[C@@H]1C
- InChI: InChI=1S/C15H19N5O/c1-3-13(21)20-8-11(5-4-10(20)2)19-15-12-6-7-16-14(12)17-9-18-15/h3,6-7,9-11H,1,4-5,8H2,2H3,(H2,16,17,18,19)/t10-,11+/m0/s1; Key:CBRJPFGIXUFMTM-WDEREUQCSA-N; Key:YOZLVAFWYLSRRN-VZXYPILPSA-N

Ritlecitinib, sold under the brand name Litfulo, is a medication used for the treatment of severe alopecia areata (hair loss). Ritlecitinib is a kinase inhibitor which inhibits Janus kinase 3 and tyrosine kinase.

The most common side effects include headache, diarrhea, acne, rashes, eczema, fever, mouth ulcers, dizziness, shingles rash, and abnormal findings in some laboratory test results.

Ritlecitinib was approved for medical use in the United States in June 2023, in the European Union in September 2023, and in Canada in November 2023.

== Medical uses ==
Ritlecitinib is indicated for the treatment of severe alopecia areata for individuals twelve years of age and older.

== History ==
The US Food and Drug Administration (FDA) approved ritlecitinib based on evidence from a clinical trial of 718 participants with severe alopecia areata. The efficacy and safety of ritlecitinib were evaluated in a randomized, double-blind, placebo controlled trial in 718 participants twelve years of age and older with alopecia areata with ≥50% scalp hair loss, including alopecia totalis and alopecia universalis. The trial randomized 130 participants to ritlecitinib 50 mg once daily, 131 participants to placebo, and 457 participants to other ritlecitinib dosing regimens. The safety evaluation was also supported by two placebo-controlled trials in which 80 participants were randomized to ritlecitinib 200 mg once daily for four weeks followed by 50 mg once daily and 82 participants were randomized to placebo. The trial was conducted at 128 sites in 18 countries in Argentina, Australia, Canada, Chile, China, Colombia, Czech Republic, Germany, Hungary, Japan, Republic of Korea, Mexico, Poland, Russian Federation, Spain, Taiwan, the United Kingdom, and the United States.

== Society and culture ==
=== Legal status ===
In 2023, ritlecitinib was approved for medical use in the United States, in the European Union, and in Canada.

=== Economics ===
The annual list price of ritlecitinib is US$49,000.
