= Povorcitinib =

Chemical compound

Clinical data
- Other names: INCB-054707
- Drug class: Disease-modifying antirheumatic drug
- ATC code: None

Identifiers
- IUPAC name: 4-[3-(cyanomethyl)-3-[4-(3,5-dimethyl-1H-pyrazol-4-yl)pyrazol-1-yl]azetidin-1-yl]-2,5-difluoro-N-[(2S)-1,1,1-trifluoropropan-2-yl]benzamide
- CAS Number: 1637677-22-5; 1637677-33-8
- PubChem CID: 86280672
- IUPHAR/BPS: 11881
- DrugBank: DB18855
- ChemSpider: 115010428
- UNII: N0JWC7RO00; MLO3DS9COC
- KEGG: D12575; D12576
- ChEMBL: ChEMBL5095079

Chemical and physical data
- Formula: C_{23}H_{22}F_{5}N_{7}O
- Molar mass: 507.469 g·mol^{−1}
- 3D model (JSmol): Interactive image
- SMILES: CC1=C(C(=NN1)C)C2=CN(N=C2)C3(CN(C3)C4=C(C=C(C(=C4)F)C(=O)N[C@@H](C)C(F)(F)F)F)CC#N
- InChI: InChI=1S/C23H22F5N7O/c1-12-20(13(2)33-32-12)15-8-30-35(9-15)22(4-5-29)10-34(11-22)19-7-17(24)16(6-18(19)25)21(36)31-14(3)23(26,27)28/h6-9,14H,4,10-11H2,1-3H3,(H,31,36)(H,32,33)/t14-/m0/s1; Key:MSGYSFWCPOBHEV-AWEZNQCLSA-N

Povorcitinib is an investigational new drug that is being evaluated for the treatment of the skin conditions hidradenitis suppurativa. It is a JAK1 inhibitor.

== Society and culture ==
=== Legal status ===
In September 2026, the Committee for Medicinal Products for Human Use of the European Medicines Agency adopted a positive opinion, recommending the granting of a marketing authorization for the medicinal product Povofortay, intended for the treatment of hidradenitis suppurativa. The applicant for this medicinal product is Incyte Biosciences Distribution.

=== Names ===
Povorcitinib is the international nonproprietary name.
