= Delgocitinib =

Chemical compound

Clinical data
- Trade names: Anzupgo, others
- Other names: JTE-052; JTE-052A
- AHFS/Drugs.com: Monograph
- MedlinePlus: a625094
- Routes of administration: Topical
- ATC code: D11AH11 (WHO)

Legal status
- Legal status: CA: ℞-only; US: ℞-only; EU: Rx-only; JP: Rx-only

Identifiers
- IUPAC name: 3-[(3S,4R)-3-methyl-7-(7H-pyrrolo[2,3-d]pyrimidin-4-yl)-1,7-diazaspiro[3.4]octan-1-yl]-3-oxopropanenitrile
- CAS Number: 1263774-59-9
- PubChem CID: 50914062
- DrugBank: DB16133
- ChemSpider: 59718502
- UNII: 9L0Q8KK220
- KEGG: D11046
- CompTox Dashboard (EPA): DTXSID401336933

Chemical and physical data
- Formula: C_{16}H_{18}N_{6}O
- Molar mass: 310.361 g·mol^{−1}
- 3D model (JSmol): Interactive image
- SMILES: C[C@H]1CN(C(=O)CC#N)[C@]12CCN(c1ncnc3[nH]ccc13)C2
- InChI: InChI=1S/C16H18N6O/c1-11-8-22(13(23)2-5-17)16(11)4-7-21(9-16)15-12-3-6-18-14(12)19-10-20-15/h3,6,10-11H,2,4,7-9H2,1H3,(H,18,19,20)/t11-,16-/m0/s1; Key:LOWWYYZBZNSPDT-ZBEGNZNMSA-N

Delgocitinib, sold under the brand name Anzupgo among others, is a medication used for the treatment of autoimmune disorders and hypersensitivity, including inflammatory skin conditions. Delgocitinib was developed by Japan Tobacco and approved in Japan for the treatment of atopic dermatitis. Delgocitinib is a Janus kinase inhibitor that works by blocking activation of the JAK-STAT signaling pathway which contributes to the pathogenesis of chronic inflammatory skin diseases.

== Medical uses ==
In the EU and the US, delgocitinib is indicated for the topical treatment of moderate to severe chronic hand eczema in adults for whom topical corticosteroids are inadequate or inappropriate.

== Society and culture ==
=== Legal status ===
In July 2024, the Committee for Medicinal Products for Human Use of the European Medicines Agency adopted a positive opinion, recommending the granting of a marketing authorization for the medicinal product Anzupgo, intended for the treatment of chronic hand eczema. The applicant for this medicinal product is LEO Pharma A/S. Anzupgo was authorized for medical use in the European Union in September 2024.

Delgocitinib was approved for medical use in the United States in July 2025.
