= Pacritinib =

Medication used to treat myelofibrosis

Clinical data
- Trade names: Vonjo
- Other names: SB1518
- License data: US DailyMed: Pacritinib
- Routes of administration: By mouth
- ATC code: L01EJ03 (WHO)

Legal status
- Legal status: US: ℞-only

Identifiers
- IUPAC name: (16E)-11-[2-(1-Pyrrolidinyl)ethoxy]-14,19-dioxa-5,7,26-triazatetracyclo[19.3.1.1^{2,6}.1^{8,12}]heptacosa-1(25),2(26),3,5,8,10,12(27),16,21,23-decaene
- CAS Number: 937272-79-2
- PubChem CID: 46216796
- DrugBank: DB11697
- ChemSpider: 28518965
- UNII: G22N65IL3O
- KEGG: D11768
- ChEBI: = CHEBI:231350 =
- ChEMBL: ChEMBL2035187
- PDB ligand: 6T3 (PDBe, RCSB PDB)
- CompTox Dashboard (EPA): DTXSID801045679

Chemical and physical data
- Formula: C_{28}H_{32}N_{4}O_{3}
- Molar mass: 472.589 g·mol^{−1}
- 3D model (JSmol): Interactive image
- SMILES: c1cc2cc(c1)-c3ccnc(n3)Nc4ccc(c(c4)COC/C=C/COC2)OCCN5CCCC5
- InChI: InChI=1S/C28H32N4O3/c1-2-13-32(12-1)14-17-35-27-9-8-25-19-24(27)21-34-16-4-3-15-33-20-22-6-5-7-23(18-22)26-10-11-29-28(30-25)31-26/h3-11,18-19H,1-2,12-17,20-21H2,(H,29,30,31)/b4-3+; Key:HWXVIOGONBBTBY-ONEGZZNKSA-N

Pacritinib, sold under the brand name Vonjo, is an anti-cancer medication used to treat myelofibrosis.

It is a macrocyclic protein kinase inhibitor. It mainly inhibits Janus kinase 2 (JAK2) and Fms-like tyrosine kinase 3\CD135 (FLT3).

Common side effects include diarrhea, low platelet counts, nausea, anemia, and swelling in legs.

== Medical uses ==
Pacritinib in indicated to treat adults who have a rare form of a bone marrow disorder known as intermediate or high-risk primary or secondary myelofibrosis and who have platelet (blood clotting cells) levels below 50,000/μL.

== History ==
The effectiveness and safety of pacritinib were demonstrated in a study that included 63 participants with intermediate or high-risk primary or secondary myelofibrosis and low platelets who received pacritinib 200 mg twice daily or standard treatment. Effectiveness was determined based upon the proportion of participants who had a 35% or greater spleen volume reduction from baseline to week 24. Nine participants (29%) in the pacritinib treatment group had a 35% or greater spleen volume reduction, compared to one participant (3%) in the standard treatment group.

The U.S. Food and Drug Administration (FDA) granted the application for pacritinib priority review, fast track, and orphan drug designations.

== Society and culture ==
=== Names ===
Pacritinib is the International nonproprietary name (INN).
