= Deucravacitinib =

Chemical compound

Clinical data
- Pronunciation: /duːˌkrævəˈsaɪtɪnɪb/ doo-KRAV-ə-SYE-ti-nib
- Trade names: Sotyktu
- Other names: BMS-986165
- AHFS/Drugs.com: Monograph
- License data: US DailyMed: Deucravacitinib
- Pregnancy category: AU: B1
- Routes of administration: By mouth
- Drug class: Tyrosine kinase 2 (TYK2) inhibitor
- ATC code: L04AF07 (WHO)

Legal status
- Legal status: AU: S4 (Prescription only); CA: ℞-only; UK: POM (Prescription only); US: ℞-only; EU: Rx-only

Pharmacokinetic data
- Bioavailability: 99%
- Protein binding: 82–90%
- Metabolism: Liver (primarily CYP1A2)
- Metabolites: BMT-153261 (active)
- Elimination half-life: 10 hours
- Excretion: Feces, urine

Identifiers
- IUPAC name: 6-(cyclopropanecarboxamido)-4-((2-methoxy-3-(1-methyl-1,2,4-triazol-3-yl)phenyl)amino)-N-(trideuteromethyl)pyridazine-3-carboxamide
- CAS Number: 1609392-27-9
- PubChem CID: 134821691
- DrugBank: DB16650
- ChemSpider: 72380005
- UNII: N0A21N6RAU
- KEGG: D11817
- ChEMBL: ChEMBL435170
- ECHA InfoCard: 100.329.069

Chemical and physical data
- Formula: C_{20}H_{19}D_{3}N_{8}O_{3}
- Molar mass: 425.466 g·mol^{−1}
- 3D model (JSmol): Interactive image
- SMILES: [2H]C([2H])([2H])NC(=O)C1=NN=C(C=C1NC2=CC=CC(=C2OC)C3=NN(C=N3)C)NC(=O)C4CC4
- InChI: InChI=1S/C20H22N8O3/c1-21-20(30)16-14(9-15(25-26-16)24-19(29)11-7-8-11)23-13-6-4-5-12(17(13)31-3)18-22-10-28(2)27-18/h4-6,9-11H,7-8H2,1-3H3,(H,21,30)(H2,23,24,25,29)/i1D3; Key:BZZKEPGENYLQSC-FIBGUPNXSA-N

Deucravacitinib, sold under the brand name Sotyktu, is a medication used for the treatment of moderate-to-severe plaque psoriasis. It is a tyrosine kinase 2 (TYK2) inhibitor and it is taken by mouth. It was developed by Bristol Myers Squibb.

Deucravacitinib was approved for medical use in the United States in September 2022, and in Australia in December 2022. The US Food and Drug Administration (FDA) considers it to be a first-in-class medication.

== Medical uses ==
Deucravacitinib is indicated for the treatment of adults with moderate-to-severe plaque psoriasis.

== Mechanism of action ==
It acts as a highly selective allosteric inhibitor of non-receptor tyrosine-protein kinase 2 (TYK2).

== Molecule design ==
The chemical structure of deucravacitinib contains a methyl amide in which all three hydrogen atoms are replaced by deuterium.

== Society and culture ==
=== Legal status ===
In January 2023, the Committee for Medicinal Products for Human Use (CHMP) of the European Medicines Agency (EMA) adopted a positive opinion, recommending the granting of a marketing authorization for the medicinal product Sotyktu, intended for the treatment of moderate to severe psoriasis. The applicant for this medicinal product is Bristol-Myers Squibb Pharma EEIG. Deucravacitinib was approved for medical use in the European Union in March 2023.
