= Tyrosine kinase 2 =

Enzyme and coding gene in humans

TYK2
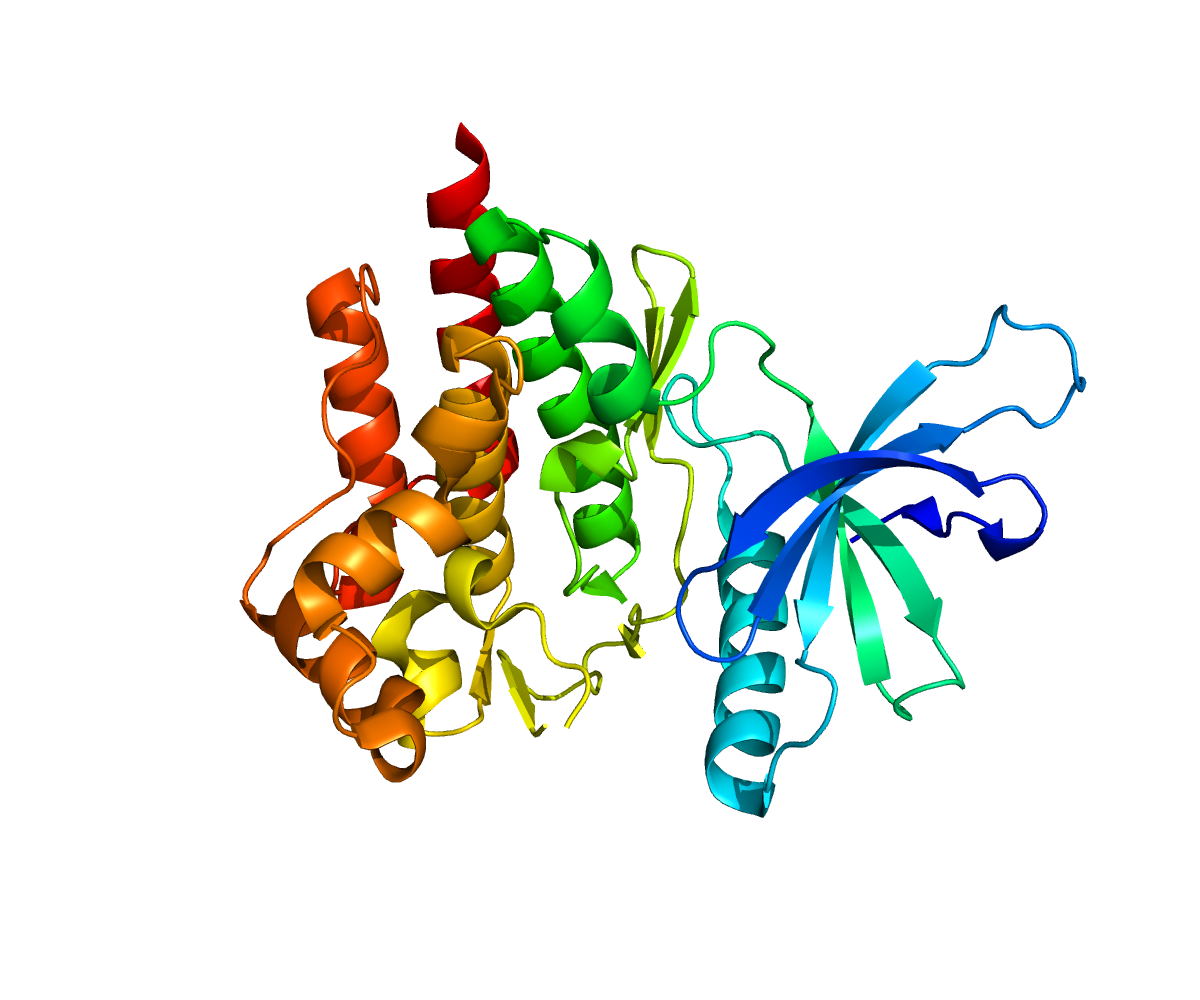

Identifiers
- Aliases: TYK2, IMD35, JTK1, tyrosine kinase 2, Non-receptor tyrosine-protein kinase
- External IDs: OMIM: 176941; MGI: 1929470; GeneCards: TYK2
Available structures
PDB	Ortholog search: PDBe RCSB
PDB	List of PDB id codes 3LXN, 3LXP, 3NYX, 3NZ0, 3ZON, 4GFO, 4GIH, 4GII, 4GJ2, 4GJ3, 4GVJ, 4OLI, 4PO6, 4PY1, 4WOV, 5C01, 5C03, 5F20, 5F1Z
Enzyme activity
EC #	BRENDA	ExPASy	KEGG	MetaCyc
2.7.10.2	↗	↗	↗	↗

Gene location (Human)
Chr.	Chromosome 19 (human)
Band	19p13.2	Start	10,350,529 bp
Band	19p13.2	End	10,380,572 bp

Gene location (Mouse)
Chr.	Chromosome 9 (mouse)
Band	9|9 A3	Start	21,015,364 bp
Band	9|9 A3	End	21,042,539 bp
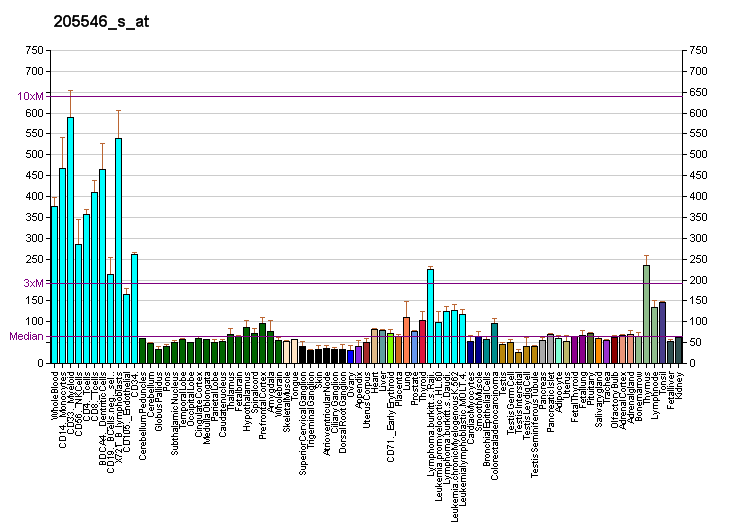
RNA expression pattern
Bgee	Human / Mouse (ortholog); Top expressed in: granulocyte; right hemisphere of cerebellum; anterior pituitary; right lobe of thyroid gland; spleen; right uterine tube; right lobe of liver; tibial nerve; right ovary; apex of heart / Top expressed in: granulocyte; mesenteric lymph nodes; tibiofemoral joint; spermatocyte; blood; renal corpuscle; Rostral migratory stream; spleen; lip; bone marrow; More reference expression data
BioGPS	More reference expression data
Gene ontology
Molecular function	transferase activity; nucleotide binding; protein kinase activity; type 1 angiotensin receptor binding; growth hormone receptor binding; kinase activity; protein binding; protein tyrosine kinase activity; ATP binding; non-membrane spanning protein tyrosine kinase activity
Cellular component	cytoplasm; cytosol; membrane; extrinsic component of cytoplasmic side of plasma membrane; extracellular exosome; cytoskeleton; nucleus
Biological process	cell differentiation; intracellular signal transduction; phosphorylation; transmembrane receptor protein tyrosine kinase signaling pathway; protein phosphorylation; regulation of type I interferon-mediated signaling pathway; regulation of cell population proliferation; type I interferon signaling pathway; peptidyl-tyrosine autophosphorylation; innate immune response; cell migration; interleukin-12-mediated signaling pathway; peptidyl-tyrosine phosphorylation; cytokine-mediated signaling pathway; interleukin-23-mediated signaling pathway; interleukin-27-mediated signaling pathway
Sources:Amigo / QuickGO
Orthologs
Databases	NCBI: entry; OMA: entry
Species	Human	Mouse
Entrez	7297	54721
Ensembl	ENSG00000105397	ENSMUSG00000032175
UniProt	P29597	Q9R117
RefSeq (mRNA)	NM_003331	NM_001205312; NM_018793
RefSeq (protein)	NP_003322	NP_001192241; NP_061263
Location (UCSC)	Chr 19: 10.35 – 10.38 Mb	Chr 9: 21.02 – 21.04 Mb
PubMed search
- Wikidata
View/Edit Human	View/Edit Mouse

Non-receptor tyrosine-protein kinase TYK2 is an enzyme that in humans is encoded by the TYK2 gene.

TYK2 was the first member of the JAK family that was described (the other members are JAK1, JAK2, and JAK3). It has been implicated in IFN-α, IL-6, IL-10 and IL-12 signaling.

== Function ==
This gene encodes a member of the tyrosine kinase and, to be more specific, the Janus kinases (JAKs) protein families. This protein associates with the cytoplasmic domain of type I and type II cytokine receptors and promulgate cytokine signals by phosphorylating receptor subunits. It is also component of both the type I and type III interferon signaling pathways. As such, it may play a role in anti-viral immunity.

Cytokines play pivotal roles in immunity and inflammation by regulating the survival, proliferation, differentiation, and function of immune cells, as well as cells from other organ systems. Hence, targeting cytokines and their receptors is an effective means of treating such disorders. Type I and II cytokine receptors associate with Janus family kinases (JAKs) to affect intracellular signaling. Cytokines including interleukins, interferons and hemopoietins activate the Janus kinases, which associate with their cognate receptors.

The mammalian JAK family has four members: JAK1, JAK2, JAK3 and tyrosine kinase 2 (TYK2). The connection between Jaks and cytokine signaling was first revealed when a screen for genes involved in interferon type I (IFN-1) signaling identified TYK2 as an essential element, which is activated by an array of cytokine receptors. TYK2 has broader and profound functions in humans than previously appreciated on the basis of analysis of murine models, which indicate that TYK2 functions primarily in IL-12 and type I-IFN signaling. TYK2 deficiency has more dramatic effects in human cells than in mouse cells. However, in addition to IFN-α and -β and IL-12 signaling, TYK2 has major effects on the transduction of IL-23, IL-10, and IL-6 signals. Since, IL-6 signals through the gp-130 receptor-chain that is common to a large family of cytokines, including IL-6, IL-11, IL-27, IL-31, oncostatin M (OSM), ciliary neurotrophic factor, cardiotrophin 1, cardiotrophin-like cytokine, and LIF, TYK2 might also affect signaling through these cytokines. Recently, it has been recognized that IL-12 and IL-23 share ligand and receptor subunits that activate TYK2. IL-10 is a critical anti-inflammatory cytokine, and IL-10^{−/−} mice suffer from fatal, systemic autoimmune disease.

TYK2 is activated by IL-10, and its deficiency affects the ability to generate and respond to IL-10. Under physiological conditions, immune cells are, in general, regulated by the action of many cytokines and it has become clear that cross-talk between different cytokine-signalling pathways is involved in the regulation of the JAK–STAT pathway.

== Role in inflammation ==
It is now widely accepted that atherosclerosis is a result of cellular and molecular events characteristic of inflammation. Vascular inflammation can be caused by upregulation of Ang-II, which is produced locally by inflamed vessels and induces synthesis and secretion of IL-6, a cytokine responsible for induction of angiotensinogen synthesis in liver through JAK/STAT3 pathway, which gets activated through high affinity membrane protein receptors on target cells, termed IL-6R-chain recruiting gp-130 that is associated with tyrosine kinases (Jaks 1/2, and TYK2 kinase). Cytokines IL-4 and IL-13 gets elevated in lungs of chronically suffered asthmatics. Signalling through IL-4/IL-13 complexes is thought to occur through IL-4Rα-chain, which is responsible for activation of JAK-1 and TYK2 kinases. A role of TYK2 in rheumatoid arthritis is directly observed in TYK2-deficient mice that were resistant to experimental arthritis. TYK2^{−/−} mice displayed a lack of responsiveness to a small amount of IFN-α, but they respond normally to a high concentration of IFN-α/β. In addition, these mice respond normally to IL-6 and IL-10, suggesting that TYK2 is dispensable for mediating for IL-6 and IL-10 signaling and does not play a major role in IFN-α signaling. Although TYK2^{−/−} mice are phenotypically normal, they exhibit abnormal responses to inflammatory challenges in a variety of cells isolated from TYK2^{−/−} mice. The most remarkable phenotype observed in TYK2-deficient macrophages was lack of nitric oxide production upon stimulation with LPS. Further elucidation of molecular mechanisms of LPS signaling, showed that TYK2 and IFN-β deficiency leads resistance to LPS-induced endotoxin shock, whereas STAT1-deficient mice are susceptible. Development of a TYK2 inhibitor appears to be a rational approach in the drug discovery.

== Clinical significance ==
A mutation in this gene has been associated with hyperimmunoglobulin E syndrome (HIES), a primary immunodeficiency characterized by elevated serum immunoglobulin E.

The P1104A allele of TYK2 has been shown to increase risk of tuberculosis when carried as a homozygote; population genetic analyses suggest that the arrival of tuberculosis in Europe drove the frequency of that allele down three-fold about 2,000 years before present.

TYK2 appears to play a central role in the inflammatory cascade responses in the pathogenesis of immune-mediated inflammatory diseases such as psoriasis. The drug deucravacitinib (marketed as Sotyktu), a small-molecule TYK2 inhibitor, was approved for moderate-to-severe plaque psoriasis in 2022.

Another TYK2 inhibitor, cadefrecitinib is being developed by Lakefront Biotherapeutics for the treatment of dermatomyositis and systemic lupus erythematosus.

== Interactions ==
Tyrosine kinase 2 has been shown to interact with FYN, PTPN6, IFNAR1, Ku80 and GNB2L1.

== See also ==
- Tyrosine kinase inhibitor
