= Hypoxia-inducible factor =

Protein that responds to low oxygen

hypoxia-inducible factor 1, alpha subunit

Identifiers
- Symbol: HIF1A
- NCBI gene: 3091
- HGNC: 4910
- OMIM: 603348
- RefSeq: NM_001530
- UniProt: Q16665

Other data
- Locus: Chr. 14 q21-q24
Search for
- Structures: Swiss-model
- Domains: InterPro

aryl hydrocarbon receptor nuclear translocator

Identifiers
- Symbol: ARNT
- Alt. symbols: HIF1B, bHLHe2
- NCBI gene: 405
- HGNC: 700
- OMIM: 126110
- RefSeq: NM_001668
- UniProt: P27540

Other data
- Locus: Chr. 1 q21
Search for
- Structures: Swiss-model
- Domains: InterPro

endothelial PAS domain protein 1

Identifiers
- Symbol: EPAS1
- Alt. symbols: HIF2A, MOP2, PASD2, HLF
- NCBI gene: 2034
- HGNC: 3374
- OMIM: 603349
- RefSeq: NM_001430
- UniProt: Q99814

Other data
- Locus: Chr. 2 p21-p16
Search for
- Structures: Swiss-model
- Domains: InterPro

aryl-hydrocarbon receptor nuclear translocator 2

Identifiers
- Symbol: ARNT2
- Alt. symbols: HIF2B, KIAA0307, bHLHe1
- NCBI gene: 9915
- HGNC: 16876
- OMIM: 606036
- RefSeq: NM_014862
- UniProt: Q9HBZ2

Other data
- Locus: Chr. 1 q24
Search for
- Structures: Swiss-model
- Domains: InterPro

hypoxia-inducible factor 3, alpha subunit

Identifiers
- Symbol: HIF3A
- NCBI gene: 64344
- HGNC: 15825
- OMIM: 609976
- RefSeq: NM_152794
- UniProt: Q9Y2N7

Other data
- Locus: Chr. 19 q13
Search for
- Structures: Swiss-model
- Domains: InterPro

Hypoxia-inducible factors (HIFs) are transcription factors that respond to decreases in available oxygen in the cellular environment, or hypoxia. They also respond to instances of pseudohypoxia, such as thiamine deficiency. Both hypoxia and pseudohypoxia leads to impairment of adenosine triphosphate (ATP) production by the mitochondria.

== Discovery ==
The HIF transcriptional complex was discovered in 1995 by Gregg L. Semenza and postdoctoral fellow Guang Wang. In 2016, William Kaelin Jr., Peter J. Ratcliffe and Gregg L. Semenza were presented the Lasker Award for their work in elucidating the role of HIF-1 in oxygen sensing and its role in surviving low oxygen conditions. In 2019, the same three individuals were jointly awarded the Nobel Prize in Physiology or Medicine for their work in elucidating how HIF senses and adapts cellular response to oxygen availability.

== Structure ==
Oxygen-breathing species express the highly conserved transcriptional complex HIF-1, which is a heterodimer composed of an alpha and a beta subunit, the latter being a constitutively-expressed aryl hydrocarbon receptor nuclear translocator (ARNT). HIF-1 belongs to the PER-ARNT-SIM (PAS) subfamily of the basic helix-loop-helix (bHLH) family of transcription factors. The alpha and beta subunit are similar in structure and both contain the following domains:

- N-terminus – a bHLH domain for DNA binding
- central region – Per-ARNT-Sim (PAS) domain, which facilitates heterodimerization
- C-terminus – recruits transcriptional coregulatory proteins

Hypoxia-inducible factor-1
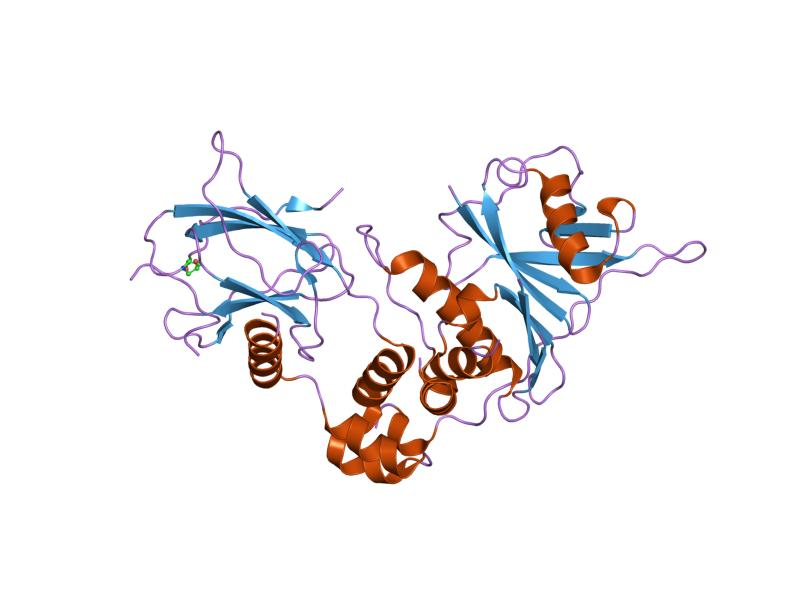
- Structure of a HIF-1a-pVHL-ElonginB-ElonginC Complex.

Identifiers
- Symbol: HIF-1
- Pfam: PF11413
Available protein structures:
- PDB: PF11413 (ECOD; PDBsum)
- AlphaFold: PF11413

HIF-1 alpha C terminal transactivation domain
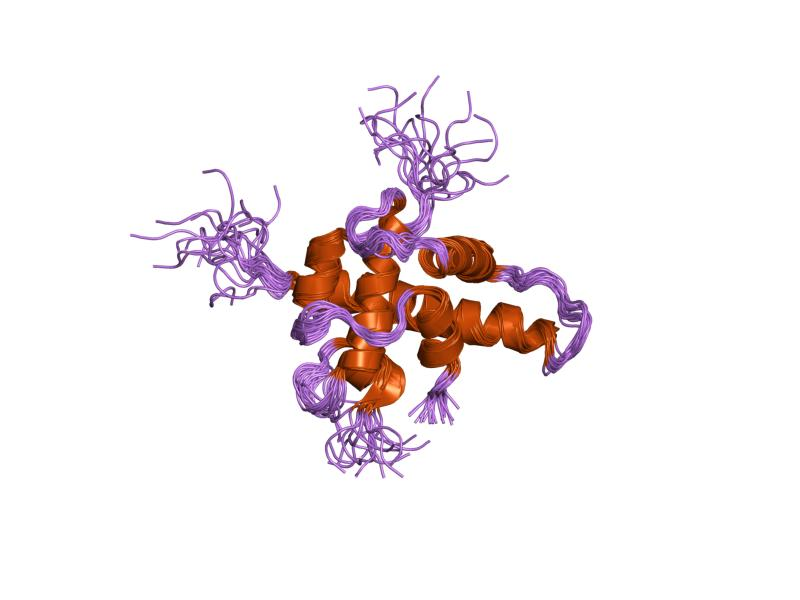
- Structure of hypoxia-inducible factor-1 alpha subunit.

Identifiers
- Symbol: HIF-1a_CTAD
- Pfam: PF08778
- InterPro: IPR014887
- SCOP2: 1l3e / SCOPe / SUPFAM
Available protein structures:
- PDB: 1h2k, 1h2l, 1l3e, 1l8c IPR014887 PF08778 (ECOD; PDBsum)
- AlphaFold: IPR014887; PF08778

== Members ==
The following are members of the human HIF family:

Member	Gene	Protein
HIF-1α	HIF1A	hypoxia-inducible factor 1, alpha subunit
HIF-1β	ARNT	aryl hydrocarbon receptor nuclear translocator
HIF-2α	EPAS1	endothelial PAS domain protein 1
HIF-2β	ARNT2	aryl-hydrocarbon receptor nuclear translocator 2
HIF-3α	HIF3A	hypoxia inducible factor 3, alpha subunit
HIF-3β	ARNT3	aryl-hydrocarbon receptor nuclear translocator 3

== Function ==
HIF1α expression in haematopoietic stem cells explains the quiescent nature of stem cells for being metabolically maintaining at a low rate so as to preserve the potency of stem cells for long periods in a life cycle of an organism.

The HIF signaling cascade mediates the effects of hypoxia, the state of low oxygen concentration, on the cell. Hypoxia often keeps cells from differentiating. However, hypoxia promotes the formation of blood vessels, and is important for the formation of a vascular system in embryos and tumors. The hypoxia in wounds also promotes the migration of keratinocytes and the restoration of the epithelium. It is therefore not surprising that HIF-1 modulation was identified as a promising treatment paradigm in wound healing.

In general, HIFs are vital to development. In mammals, deletion of the HIF-1 genes results in perinatal death. HIF-1 has been shown to be vital to chondrocyte survival, allowing the cells to adapt to low-oxygen conditions within the growth plates of bones. HIF plays a central role in the regulation of human metabolism.

== Mechanism ==
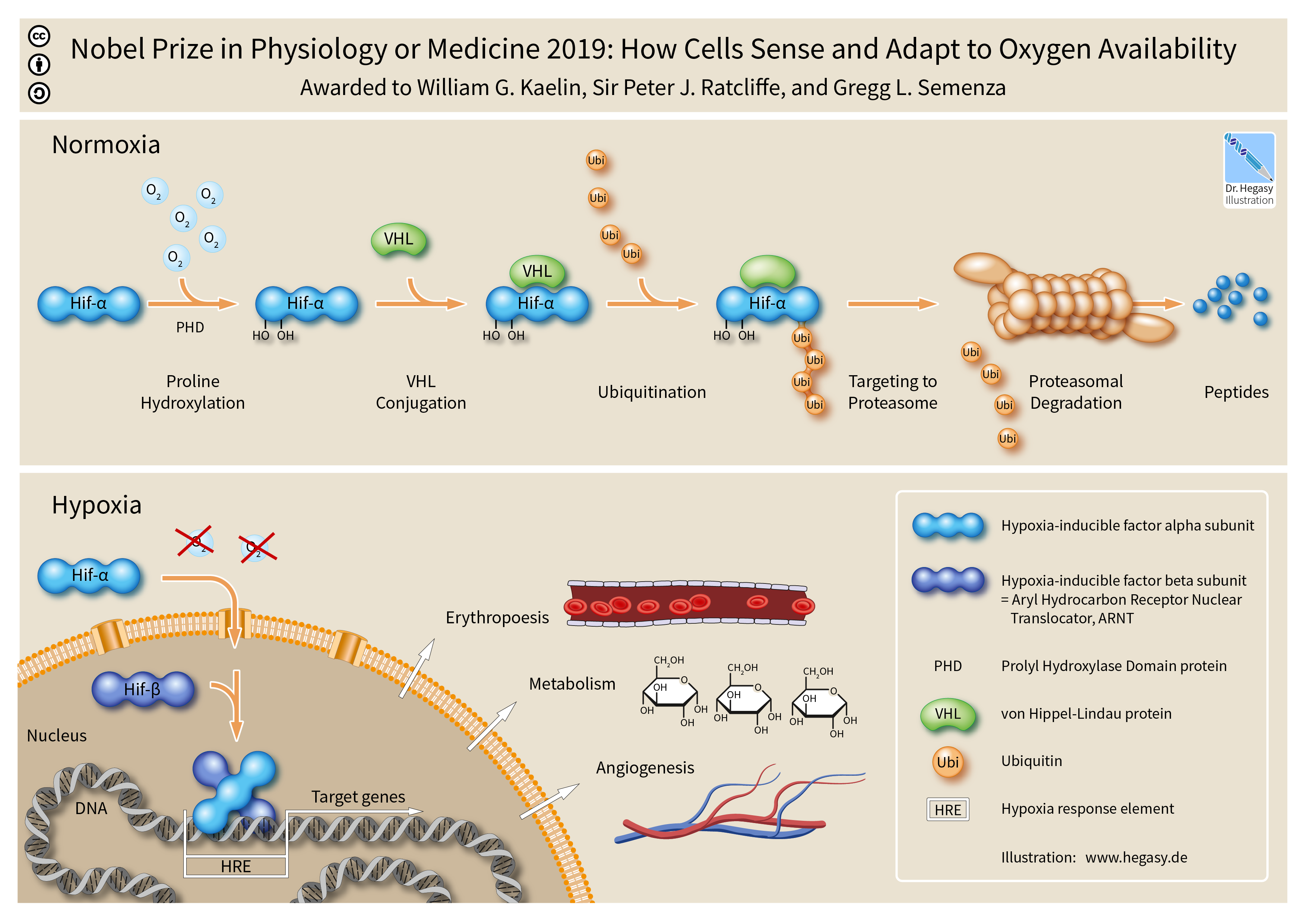
Nobel Prize in Physiology or Medicine 2019: How Cells Sense and Adapt to Oxygen Availability. Under normoxic conditions, Hif-1 alpha is hydroxylated at two proline residues. It then associates with VHL and is tagged with ubiquitin resulting in proteasomal degradation. Under hypoxic conditions, Hif-1 alpha translocates to the cell nucleus and associates with Hif-1 beta. This complex then binds to the HRE region of the DNA resulting in the transcription of genes that are involved in a multitude of processes including erythropoesis, glycolysis, and angiogenesis.

The alpha subunits of HIF are hydroxylated at conserved proline residues by HIF prolyl-hydroxylases, allowing their recognition and ubiquitination by the VHL E3 ubiquitin ligase, which labels them for rapid degradation by the proteasome. This occurs only in normoxic conditions. In hypoxic conditions, HIF prolyl-hydroxylase is inhibited, since it utilizes oxygen as a cosubstrate.

Inhibition of electron transfer in the succinate dehydrogenase complex due to mutations in the SDHB or SDHD genes can cause a build-up of succinate that inhibits HIF prolyl-hydroxylase, stabilizing HIF-1α. This is termed pseudohypoxia.

HIF-1, when stabilized by hypoxic conditions, upregulates several genes to promote survival in low-oxygen conditions. These include glycolysis enzymes, which allow ATP synthesis in an oxygen-independent manner, and vascular endothelial growth factor (VEGF), which promotes angiogenesis. HIF-1 acts by binding to hypoxia-responsive elements (HREs) in promoters that contain the sequence 5'-RCGTG-3' (where R is a purine, either A or G). Studies demonstrate that hypoxia modulates histone methylation and reprograms chromatin. This paper was published back-to-back with that of 2019 Nobel Prize in Physiology or Medicine winner for Medicine William Kaelin Jr. This work was highlighted in an independent editorial.

It has been shown that muscle A kinase–anchoring protein (mAKAP) organized E3 ubiquitin ligases, affecting stability and positioning of HIF-1 inside its action site in the nucleus. Depletion of mAKAP or disruption of its targeting to the perinuclear (in cardiomyocytes) region altered the stability of HIF-1 and transcriptional activation of genes associated with hypoxia. Thus, "compartmentalization" of oxygen-sensitive signaling components may influence the hypoxic response.

The advanced knowledge of the molecular regulatory mechanisms of HIF1 activity under hypoxic conditions contrast sharply with the paucity of information on the mechanistic and functional aspects governing NF-κB-mediated HIF1 regulation under normoxic conditions. However, HIF-1α stabilization is also found in non-hypoxic conditions through an unknown mechanism. It was shown that NF-κB (nuclear factor κB) is a direct modulator of HIF-1α expression in the presence of normal oxygen pressure. siRNA (small interfering RNA) studies for individual NF-κB members revealed differential effects on HIF-1α mRNA levels, indicating that NF-κB can regulate basal HIF-1α expression. Finally, it was shown that, when endogenous NF-κB is induced by TNFα (tumour necrosis factor α) treatment, HIF-1α levels also change in an NF-κB-dependent manner. HIF-1 and HIF-2 have different physiological roles. HIF-2 regulates erythropoietin production in adult life.

=== Repair, regeneration and rejuvenation ===
In normal circumstances after injury HIF-1a is degraded by prolyl hydroxylases (PHDs). In June 2015, scientists found that the continued up-regulation of HIF-1a via PHD inhibitors regenerates lost or damaged tissue in mammals that have a repair response; and the continued down-regulation of Hif-1a results in healing with a scarring response in mammals with a previous regenerative response to the loss of tissue. The act of regulating HIF-1a can either turn off, or turn on the key process of mammalian regeneration. One such regenerative process in which HIF1A is involved is skin healing. Researchers at the Stanford University School of Medicine demonstrated that HIF1A activation was able to prevent and treat chronic wounds in diabetic and aged mice. Not only did the wounds in the mice heal more quickly, but the quality of the new skin was even better than the original. Additionally the regenerative effect of HIF-1A modulation on aged skin cells was described and a rejuvenating effect on aged facial skin was demonstrated in patients. HIF modulation has also been linked to a beneficial effect on hair loss. The biotech company Tomorrowlabs GmbH, founded in Vienna in 2016 by the physician Dominik Duscher and pharmacologist Dominik Thor, makes use of this mechanism. Based on the patent-pending HSF ("HIF strengthening factor") active ingredient, products have been developed that are supposed to promote skin and hair regeneration.

== As a therapeutic target ==
=== Anemia ===
Several drugs that act as selective HIF prolyl-hydroxylase inhibitors have been developed. The most notable compounds are: Roxadustat (FG-4592); Vadadustat (AKB-6548), Daprodustat (GSK1278863), Desidustat (ZYAN-1), and Molidustat (Bay 85-3934), all of which are intended as orally acting drugs for the treatment of anemia. Other significant compounds from this family, which are used in research but have not been developed for medical use in humans, include MK-8617, YC-1, IOX-2, 2-methoxyestradiol, GN-44028, AKB-4924, Bay 87-2243, FG-2216 and FG-4497. By inhibiting prolyl-hydroxylase enzyme, the stability of HIF-2α in the kidney is increased, which results in an increase in endogenous production of erythropoietin. Both FibroGen compounds made it through to Phase II clinical trials, but these were suspended temporarily in May 2007 following the death of a trial participant taking FG-2216 from fulminant hepatitis (liver failure), however it is unclear whether this death was actually caused by FG-2216. The hold on further testing of FG-4592 was lifted in early 2008, after the FDA reviewed and approved a thorough response from FibroGen. Roxadustat, vadadustat, daprodustat and molidustat have now all progressed through to Phase III clinical trials for treatment of renal anemia.

=== Inflammation and cancer ===
In other scenarios and in contrast to the therapy outlined above, research suggests that HIF induction in normoxia is likely to have serious consequences in disease settings with a chronic inflammatory component. It has also been shown that chronic inflammation is self-perpetuating and that it distorts the microenvironment as a result of aberrantly active transcription factors. As a consequence, alterations in growth factor, chemokine, cytokine, and ROS balance occur within the cellular milieu that in turn provide the axis of growth and survival needed for de novo development of cancer and metastasis. These results have numerous implications for a number of pathologies where NF-κB and HIF-1 are deregulated, including rheumatoid arthritis and cancer. Therefore, it is thought that understanding the cross-talk between these two key transcription factors, NF-κB and HIF, will greatly enhance the process of drug development.

HIF activity is involved in angiogenesis required for cancer tumor growth, so HIF inhibitors such as phenethyl isothiocyanate and Acriflavine are (since 2006) under investigation for anti-cancer effects.

=== Neurology ===
Research conducted on mice suggests that stabilizing HIF using an HIF prolyl-hydroxylase inhibitor enhances hippocampal memory, likely by increasing erythropoietin expression. HIF pathway activators such as ML-228 may have neuroprotective effects and are of interest as potential treatments for stroke and spinal cord injury.

=== Von hippel–lindau disease-associated renal cell carcinoma ===
Belzutifan is an hypoxia-inducible factor-2α inhibitor under investigation for the treatment of von Hippel–Lindau disease-associated renal cell carcinoma.
