= Kyntra Bio =

American biopharmaceutical company

Kyntra Bio, Inc.
- Company type: Public
- Traded as: Nasdaq: KYNB
- Industry: Biotechnology
- Founded: 1993
- Founder: Thomas B. Neff
- Headquarters: Virtual office address: 350 Bay Street, Suite 100 #6009, San Francisco, California
- Key people: Thane Wettig (CEO); David DeLucia (CFO); John Alden (General Counsel)
- Number of employees: 34 US employees (December 2025)
- Website: kyntrabio.com

Kyntra Bio, Inc. (formerly FibroGen, Inc.) is a biopharmaceutical company headquartered in San Francisco, California. Once regarded as a promising developer of innovative therapies for anemia and fibrotic diseases, with a market capitalization of roughly $4 billion in 2018–19, the company's value collapsed following late-stage trial failures, regulatory setbacks, and a data manipulation scandal. By 2026, Kyntra was mainly reduced to a single early-stage oncology drug candidate.

On January 8, 2026, FibroGen changed its name to Kyntra Bio and ticker symbol to KYNB.

== History ==
FibroGen was founded in 1993 by investment banker Thomas B. Neff and Finnish biochemist Kari Kivirikko, a professor at the University of Oulu. The company’s early ambition was to commercialize synthetic collagen for use in plastic surgery. Over time, FibroGen redirected its main focus toward a broader goal: developing medicines that could stimulate red blood cell production for patients suffering from anemia. FibroGen established a Finnish subsidiary, FibroGen Europe Oy, in Oulu in 1996 to develop recombinant collagen technologies, and the subsidiary was briefly considered as a potential IPO candidate in 2000, but it never materialized and the operation eventually became dormant. (The company's early work in recombinant collagen biomaterials would later inform development of corneal regeneration in China in the 2010s and 2020s.)

By the 2000s, FibroGen had gathered momentum around a promising compound that boosted red blood cell production, a drug that would eventually be known as roxadustat. The company signed partnership agreements with Astellas in 2004 and 2006, granting rights in Japan, Europe, and other regions. The 2006 agreement was viewed within the industry as highly favorable to FibroGen.

In the following decade, FibroGen established a partnership with AstraZeneca, which was seeking to rebuild its development pipeline. The 2013 collaboration granted AstraZeneca rights to roxadustat in the United States, China, and other territories not covered by Astellas, setting the stage for the company’s 2014 Nasdaq IPO. By then, FibroGen faced a tightening race, as GlaxoSmithKline (Daprodustat) and the Ohio-based startup Akebia Therapeutics (Vadadustat) advanced rival HIF-PH inhibitors. But FibroGen retained a crucial lead. In what Fierce Pharma called "a rare event, if not a singular one in the biopharma world," roxadustat became "the first first-in-class drug developed by multinational pharmaceutical companies to be approved in China before the United States, European Union, or Japan" when Chinese regulators gave their approval at the end of 2018, followed by its commercial rollout the next year.

That milestone marked the peak of FibroGen’s ascent. By 2018–19, its market capitalization had reached roughly US$4 billion. Founder Thomas Neff, who had served as CEO and chairman since the company’s inception, lived to see his vision realized with roxadustat’s approval and at the cusp of launch in China before his unexpected death on August 25, 2019. In the years following his passing, the company faced growing management turmoil, fraudulent clinical data, failed trials, and a sharp decline in its fortunes.

In 2021, FibroGen disclosed that efficacy data for roxadustat submitted to the US Food and Drug Administration had been manipulated, prompting regulatory scrutiny and a subsequent rejection of its approval application. Over the next few years, multiple late-stage clinical trials across its pipeline failed, leading the company to significantly reduce its workforce in 2023 and 2024. In July 2024, FibroGen discontinued pamrevlumab following failed trials in pancreatic cancer, triggering further layoffs and a broader restructuring that eliminated most of its US-based staff. In October 2024, the company paid $10 million to terminate its lease for its longtime Mission Bay headquarters, citing the reduced need for office space. Meanwhile, rival Akebia Therapeutics won FDA approval for its competing anemia drug in March 2024, capturing the US market for anemia in dialysis patients with chronic kidney disease.

In August 2025, FibroGen sold its Chinese subsidiary, FibroGen China, to AstraZeneca for approximately US$220 million, including enterprise value and cash held in the country. The total consideration was initially set at around US$160 million when first announced in February 2025 and was revised upward twice (first to US$185 million and then finally to US$220 million) reflecting stronger than expected roxadustat sales in China. The proceeds from the sale was necessary to pay off a loan of approximately US$81 million with Morgan Stanley Tactical Value and to provide the company with a longer financial runway into 2028.

Following the sale of its Chinese subsidiary, FibroGen is now left primarily with FG-3246, an asset it acquired from Fortis Therapeutics, a defunct biotech company, at no upfront cost with a large milestone due only if the drug advances into Phase 3. FibroGen's future largely depends on the development of this unpromising drug.

== Products and research ==
Phase 3 Trials for FDA-Submitted Programs
Drug / Program	Indication	Phase 3 Trial(s)	Outcome	Notes
Roxadustat	Anemia in Chronic Kidney Disease (CKD)	ANDES, OLYMPUS, ALPS, ROCKIES, SIERRAS, HIMALAYAS, PYRENEES	FDA rejected August 2021	Company changed prespecified statistical criteria for cardiovascular safety analysis and FDA raised concerns about data integrity
Roxadustat	Anemia in Myelodysplastic Syndromes (MDS)	MATTERHORN	Failed May 2023	Did not meet primary endpoint
Pamrevlumab	Idiopathic Pulmonary Fibrosis (IPF)	ZEPHYRUS-1, ZEPHYRUS-2	Failed June 2023	ZEPHYRUS-1 missed primary endpoint; ZEPHYRUS-2 terminated after interim review
Pamrevlumab	Duchenne Muscular Dystrophy (DMD)	LELANTOS-1, LELANTOS-2	Failed June–August 2023	Both trials failed to meet primary endpoints on motor function
Pamrevlumab	Pancreatic Cancer (Locally Advanced, unresectable)	LAPIS	Failed July 2024	Did not meet primary or key secondary endpoints
Pamrevlumab	Pancreatic Cancer (Precision Promise platform trial)	Precision Promise arm	Failed July 2024	Program discontinued

FibroGen has focused on therapies for anemia, fibrotic diseases, and cancer. Its former flagship product, roxadustat, was developed for anemia associated with chronic kidney disease for multiple global markets, though it only achieved commercial success in China, where it became the company’s golden goose. All of its US Phase 3 trials for both roxadustat and pamrevlumab including indications for anemia, Duchenne muscular dystrophy, idiopathic pulmonary fibrosis, and pancreatic cancer ultimately failed or were rejected. In 2025, the only significant remaining asset is FG-3246.

=== Roxadustat ===
Roxadustat is a first-in-class oral drug for the treatment of anemia associated with chronic kidney disease. Developed by FibroGen, it stimulates the body’s natural production of red blood cells by inhibiting hypoxia-inducible factor prolyl hydroxylase, thereby activating the body’s response to low oxygen levels. This mechanism, which was later recognized by the 2019 Nobel Prize in Physiology or Medicine, represented a departure from traditional injectable therapies that relied on synthetic erythropoietin. William Kaelin, one of the Nobel laureates honored for this discovery, has also served as chairman of FibroGen’s Scientific Advisory Board in the United States.

Roxadustat also attracted attention outside clinical development. In 2015, while still undergoing trials, the compound was linked to professional cycling doping cases when Italian rider Fabio Taborre and Chilean rider Carlos Oyarzun tested positive for the substance; the World Anti-Doping Agency had already classified roxadustat as a banned substance despite its not yet being commercially available at the time.

==== Preclinical and partnerships ====
FibroGen began developing the compound in the early 2000s as part of its anti-fibrosis research program. Early preclinical studies indicated that roxadustat (then referred to as FG-4592) could stimulate red blood cell production, prompting the company to shift its focus toward anemia and select FG-4592 as its lead candidate. By the mid-2000s, FibroGen was considered a potential challenger to Amgen’s dominance in the anemia drug market, with its oral therapy viewed as more convenient for patients and potentially more cost-effective than the injectable treatments that defined the standard of care.

To support global development, FibroGen entered into major licensing agreements with Astellas in 2004 and 2006. The 2004 agreement granted Astellas rights in Japan, while the 2006 agreement extended exclusive rights to develop and commercialize FG-4592 and related compounds in Europe, the Commonwealth of Independent States, the Middle East, and South Africa, with FibroGen retaining rights elsewhere. The companies also agreed to share the costs of the US development program and patent support. Despite the significant payments, FibroGen retained the US and China rights. In 2013, FibroGen partnered with AstraZeneca to develop and commercialize roxadustat. Under the US agreement, AstraZeneca gained rights to commercialize the drug in the United States and all countries outside China and territories licensed to Astellas, while under a separate China agreement, FibroGen and AstraZeneca shared profits and losses 50/50.

In February 2024, following the debacles with US clinical trials, AstraZeneca returned US commercial rights for roxadustat to FibroGen. In contrast, the China collaboration with AstraZeneca remained successful. In July 2020, FibroGen China and AstraZeneca entered into an amendment to their China agreement to address the commercialization of roxadustat in China.

==== Clinical trials ====
In 2011, FibroGen established FibroGen (China) to run Phase III trials and seek approval of roxadustat as a Class 1 innovative drug. The National Medical Products Administration approved roxadustat in December 2018 for anaemia in patients with chronic kidney disease not on dialysis. In August 2019, approval was extended to include patients on dialysis.

Roxadustat was approved in Japan in September 2019 for the treatment of anemia associated with chronic kidney disease in dialysis-dependent patients, based on the results of four Phase III clinical trials conducted in the country. In the European Union, roxadustat received approval in August 2021 for the treatment of symptomatic anemia in adults with chronic kidney disease. This approval was supported by a large-scale global Phase III program, consisting of eight multicenter, randomized studies that enrolled over 9,000 patients across multiple countries.

In the US, roxadustat’s development was derailed after FibroGen admitted in April 2021 that it had altered heart safety analyses to make the anemia drug appear safer than it was, prompting investor lawsuits and damaging credibility. The Food and Drug Administration later rejected FibroGen’s application for roxadustat to treat anemia in chronic kidney disease by issuing a Complete Response Letter in August 2021, citing concerns about the drug’s safety data. FibroGen’s Phase 3 MATTERHORN trial evaluating roxadustat in lower-risk myelodysplastic syndrome also failed in 2023.

Following the last clinical setback in 2023 and the return of US rights by AstraZeneca in 2024, the company continues to pursue development of roxadustat in the US for anemia in lower-risk myelodysplastic syndromes with a high transfusion burden, a narrower clinical sub-set of the 2023 trial population. In July 2025, FibroGen held a Type C meeting, a catch-all meeting for clarifications, with the Food and Drug Administration to take a step forward. At the end of 2025, roxadustat was also granted Orphan Drug Designation by the FDA for the treatment of myelodysplastic syndromes.

==== Sales ====
Roxadustat was commercially launched in July 2019 in China. Within one year of launch, the drug established itself as the leading therapy for anemia in patients with chronic kidney disease in China, aided by inclusion in the national medical insurance catalog. Sales grew from about 500 million yuan in 2020 to over 1 billion yuan in 2021, and surpassed 2 billion yuan in 2023. By 2024, the drug held approximately 46% market share in its therapeutic category. Chinese pharmaceutical analysts characterized this trajectory as "unprecedented" for a non-oncology chemical drug, calling roxadustat a "miraculous medicine."

In Japan and Europe, sales were disappointing: Astellas, which commercializes roxadustat under the brand Evrenzo in those regions, recorded a ¥47 billion ($348 million) impairment charge in 2023 due to lower-than-expected sales. In Japan, roxadustat faces stiff competition from four other approved HIF prolyl hydroxylase inhibitors, limiting its market share despite being the first HIF-PH inhibitor to be clinically used worldwide. In Europe, the drug struggled to differentiate itself from existing erythropoiesis-stimulating agents.

=== Pamrevlumab ===
Pamrevlumab is a monoclonal antibody targeting connective tissue growth factor, developed by FibroGen for the treatment of fibrotic and oncologic diseases. FibroGen initiated clinical development in 2003 with an Investigational New Drug submission to the FDA for idiopathic pulmonary fibrosis, followed by a second IND for pancreatic cancer in 2004.

The program significantly expanded beginning in 2011, when FibroGen launched a comprehensive Phase 2 clinical trial program across multiple indications including idiopathic pulmonary fibrosis, pancreatic cancer, and Duchenne muscular dystrophy. Between 2011 and 2018, the company conducted eleven Phase 1 and Phase 2 clinical studies, enrolling over 450 patients treated with pamrevlumab, with approximately half dosed for more than six months. The flagship study was PRAISE, a 103-patient randomized, double-blind, placebo-controlled trial in IPF that enrolled patients from August 2013 to July 2017 across 39 medical centers in seven countries.

After advancing pamrevlumab into multiple unsuccessful Phase 3 trials in IPF (ZEPHYRUS-1 and ZEPHYRUS-2), Duchenne muscular dystrophy (LELANTOS-1 and LELANTOS-2), and pancreatic cancer (LAPIS and the investigator-sponsored Precision Promise trial), FibroGen discontinued the program in August 2024 following the failure of its final two pancreatic cancer studies. Both the LAPIS trial of neoadjuvant pamrevlumab with chemotherapy and the Precision Promise trial of first-line therapy missed their primary endpoint of overall survival, bringing an end to pamrevlumab’s clinical development. The announcement sent FibroGen’s stock down 48% and prompted the company to reduce its workforce by 75%.

=== FG-3246 ===
FG-3246 (also called FOR46) is an experimental antibody–drug conjugate developed by FibroGen to treat metastatic castration-resistant prostate cancer. It targets CD46 on cancer cells to deliver MMAE chemotherapy directly to the tumor. FibroGen is also developing FG-3180, a PET imaging agent, to help track the cancer and predict responses to FG-3246. A Phase 2 trial of FG-3246 began in September 2025, with full completion expected in March 2028.

FibroGen licensed FG-3246 from Fortis Therapeutics in May 2023 as it sought to rebuild its pipeline after several clinical failures. In April 2024, FibroGen reported Phase 1 results showing a 36% PSA50 response rate in heavily pre-treated metastatic castration-resistant prostate cancer patients. The results compared unfavorably to the 56% PSA50 rate reported by competitor Janux Therapeutics for its PSMA-targeting therapy JANX007.

=== Corneal program ===
From its founding in 1993 by Thomas Neff, FibroGen focused on therapies targeting fibrosis and cancer, drawing on its expertise in collagen and extracellular matrix biology. As an extension of this research, the company developed recombinant human collagen suitable for corneal repair.

FibroGen identified China as a key market for its biosynthetic cornea because of the country’s "extreme shortage of cadaver corneas" according to the 2018 annual report. Cultural and religious reluctance toward organ donation, along with a 2017 government ban on importing human tissue, has left many patients with corneal blindness without access to transplants. FibroGen’s FG-5200 program aimed to fill this gap by offering a fully synthetic alternative made from recombinant human collagen.

In 2021, FibroGen licensed global rights to its investigational biosynthetic cornea, made from recombinant human collagen, to Eluminex Biosciences (Suzhou) Limited in China. The partnership expanded in 2023 to include additional collagen-based technologies, with Eluminex advancing the program toward clinical trials in China. That same year, the first patient implantation of the biosynthetic cornea was completed as part of trials in China. Eluminex operates facilities for recombinant collagen production and biopharmaceutical development at Suzhou Industrial Park BioBAY.

== Legal and regulatory issues ==
=== Securities fraud litigation ===
Following revelations that FibroGen's former chief medical officer manipulated clinical trial data for Roxadustat, the company faced a securities class action in 2021 in the United States District Court for the Northern District of California over allegedly false or misleading statements; the case was settled for $28.5 million. Stockholders later filed a derivative action in the Delaware Court of Chancery claiming that FibroGen directors breached their fiduciary duties under Malone and Caremark theories. In October 2024, the court dismissed the derivative claims, finding that the plaintiffs had not pleaded sufficient facts to show that directors knowingly approved or ignored the false statements based on the manipulated trial data.

=== SEC investigation ===
In September 2025, FibroGen agreed to pay $1.25 million to the SEC to settle allegations that its former chief medical officer manipulated clinical trial data for roxadustat. According to the SEC, between 2019 and 2021 the executive “reverse engineered” Phase III trial results to make the drug appear superior to existing treatments when it was in fact only comparable. The misleading claims were alleged to have been made in SEC filings, press releases, earnings calls, and a published article. The SEC also alleged that the company misrepresented the FDA’s position on the statistical methods used. FibroGen did not admit wrongdoing but agreed to pay the settlement over the following year.
