= Hypoxia-inducible factor-proline dioxygenase =

Class of enzymes

Identifiers
- EC no.: 1.14.11.29

Databases
- BRENDA: enzyme data
- ExPASy: NiceZyme view
- KEGG: enzyme entry
- MetaCyc: metabolic pathway
- Rhea: reactions
- PDB structures: RCSB PDB PDBe PDBsum
Search
- PMC: articles
- PubMed: articles
- NCBI: proteins

Hypoxia-inducible factor-proline dioxygenase (EC 1.14.11.29, HIF hydroxylase) is an enzyme with systematic name hypoxia-inducible factor-L-proline, 2-oxoglutarate:oxygen oxidoreductase (4-hydroxylating). This enzyme catalyses the following chemical reaction

hypoxia-inducible factor-L-proline + 2-oxoglutarate + O_{2} $\rightleftharpoons$ hypoxia-inducible factor-trans-4-hydroxy-L-proline + succinate + CO_{2}

Hypoxia-inducible factor-proline dioxygenase contains iron, and requires ascorbate.

Hypoxia-inducible factor (HIF) is an evolutionarily conserved transcription factor that allows the cell to respond physiologically to low concentrations of oxygen. A class of prolyl hydroxylases which act specifically on HIF has been identified; hydroxylation of HIF allows the protein to be targeted for degradation. HIF prolyl-hydroxylase has been targeted by a variety of inhibitors that aim to treat stroke, kidney disease, ischemia, anemia, and other important diseases. Clinically observed prolyl hydroxylase domain mutations, as in the case of erythrocytosis- and breast cancer-associated PHD2 mutations, affect its selectivity for its HIF substrate, which has important implication for drug design.

In humans, there are three isoforms of hypoxia-inducible factor-proline dioxygenase. These are PHD1, PHD2 and PHD3. PHD2, in particular, was identified as the most important human oxygen sensors due to its slow reaction with oxygen.
