= PHD =

PHD, PhD, or Ph.D. may refer to:

- Doctor of Philosophy (PhD), an academic qualification

== Comics ==
- PhD: Phantasy Degree, a Korean comic series
- Piled Higher and Deeper or PhD Comics, a webcomic

== Music ==
- Ph.D. (band), a 1980s British group
  - Ph.D. (Ph.D. album)
- Ph.D. (Art Farmer album)
- "PHD", a song on the album Tweekend by the Crystal Method

== Other uses ==
- Planetary health diet, a diet designed to be healthy, adaptable to diverse cultures, and environmentally sustainable
- PHD finger, a protein sequence
- Harry Clever Field (IATA and FAA LID: PHD), a US airport

== See also ==
- EGLN2 or PHD1, an enzyme
- EGLN1 or PHD2, an enzyme
- EGLN3 or PHD3, an enzyme
- Naval Surface Warfare Center Port Hueneme (NSWC PHD), California, US
