= HIF prolyl-hydroxylase inhibitor =

Drug class

- Drug class
- Roxadustat, the first marketed HIF prolyl-hydroxylase inhibitor

Class identifiers
- ATC code: B03X
- Mechanism of action: Enzyme inhibitor
- Biological target: HIF prolyl-hydroxylase

Legal status

Hypoxia-inducible factor prolyl hydroxylase inhibitors (HIF-PHIs) are a novel class of oral medications developed for the treatment of anemia in chronic kidney disease (CKD). These drugs work by inhibiting hypoxia-inducible factor-proline dioxygenase (HIF prolyl-hydroxylase), which are responsible for the degradation of hypoxia-inducible factor (HIF) under normal oxygen conditions. By stabilizing HIF, these inhibitors mimic the body's natural response to hypoxia, leading to increased endogenous erythropoietin production and improved iron metabolism. HIF-PHIs have shown efficacy in correcting and maintaining hemoglobin levels in both dialysis-dependent and non-dialysis-dependent CKD patients, offering an alternative to traditional erythropoiesis-stimulating agents (ESAs).

== Therapeutic applications ==
=== Renal anemia ===
Several HIF-PHIs, including roxadustat, daprodustat, vadadustat, molidustat, and enarodustat, have been approved in various countries for the treatment of renal anemia. While these drugs have demonstrated promising results in clinical trials, ongoing research is focused on evaluating their long-term safety profile, particularly regarding cardiovascular outcomes, thromboembolic events, and potential effects on tumor growth.

=== Other indications ===
Outside of chronic kidney disease, Akebia Therapeutics has reported preliminary findings from its phase II study on Vadadustat for acute respiratory distress syndrome (ARDS) in COVID-19 patients. Based on these results, Akebia Therapeutics plans to proceed with a phase III study targeting a broader ARDS patient population.

== Regulatory status ==
In Japan, all three drugs are available for clinical use. In the European Union, Vadadustat and Daprodustat are currently under regulatory review for potential approval as of 2023. In early 2023, the U.S. FDA approved Daprodustat following a positive advisory committee decision, which supported its favorable benefit-risk profile. Vadadustat, however, is awaiting a decision on a formal dispute resolution appeal, especially in light of the recent FDA approval for Daprodustat.

== Clinical development ==
As of 2023, Vadadustat, Daprodustat, and Roxadustat are the most extensively studied HIF-PHIs, with a significant volume of phase III and phase IV data supporting their use in treating chronic kidney disease.

== Commercial development ==
The rights to Vadadustat are held by Akebia Therapeutics in partnership with CSL Vifor. Roxadustat is owned by Fibrogen in partnership with Astellas, while Daprodustat has been developed internally by GSK.

== Examples ==
- Daprodustat
- Desidustat
- Enarodustat
- Molidustat
- Roxadustat (marketed in China)
- Vadadustat

== See also ==
- Hypoxia-inducible factors#As a therapeutic target
