= Factor Inhibiting HIF Asparaginyl Hydroxylase Inhibitors =

Factor Inhibiting HIF (FIH) Asparaginyl Hydroxylase Inhibitors inhibit the FIH pathway also catalyzed by Asparaginyl Hydroxylase inhibition. Before 2010s thought to be identical to HIF prolyl-hydroxylase pathway, studies have shown FIH to be the master regulator (relative to HIF) that controls HIF transcriptional activity in an oxygen-dependent manner. and that HIF prolyl-hydroxylase inhibitors may only minimally inhibit FIH. Skeletal muscle expresses 50-fold higher levels of FIH than other tissues.

The cytoplasmic tail of MT1-MMP, which can bind to FIH-1, promotes inhibition of FIH-1 during normoxia.

== History ==
FIH and the PHDs (HIF prolyl-hydroxylase) share some enzymatic properties, including cofactors and by-products, this has led to the assumption that PHDs and FIH are functionally redundant in their regulation of HIF. It has also been difficult to account for FIH's distinct evolutionary history as an oxygen sensor.

== Inhibitors ==
- 1,4-DPCA (1,4-dihydrophenonthrolin-4-one-3carboxylicacid)
