= Rab4b-egln2 readthrough (nmd candidate) =

Non-coding RNA in the species Homo sapiens

RAB4B-EGLN2

Identifiers
- Aliases: RAB4B-EGLN2, RERT-lncRNA, RAB4B-EGLN2 readthrough (NMD candidate), EGLN2, EIT-6, EIT6, HPH-3, HPH-1, PHD1, HIF-PH1
- External IDs: GeneCards: RAB4B-EGLN2; OMA:RAB4B-EGLN2 - orthologs
Orthologs
Species	Human	Mouse
Entrez	100529264	n/a
Ensembl	ENSG00000171570	n/a
UniProt	n a	n/a
RefSeq (mRNA)	n/a	n/a
RefSeq (protein)	n/a	n/a
Location (UCSC)	n/a	n/a
PubMed search		n/a
- Wikidata
View/Edit Human

RAB4B-EGLN2 readthrough (NMD candidate) is a protein that in humans is encoded by the RAB4B-EGLN2 gene.

== Function ==
This locus represents naturally occurring read-through transcription between the neighboring RAB4B (RAB4B, member RAS oncogene family) and EGLN2 (egl nine homolog 2) genes on chromosome 19. The read-through transcript is a candidate for nonsense-mediated mRNA decay (NMD), and is thus unlikely to produce a protein product. [provided by RefSeq, Feb 2011].
