= Ovaprene =

Ovaprene is an experimental non-hormonal contraception developed by Daré Bioscience that is composed of an intervaginal device that releases ferrous gluconate, ascorbic acid, and glycine.
