= Fabiola Gianotti =

Italian physicist, previous director general of the European Council for Nuclear Research

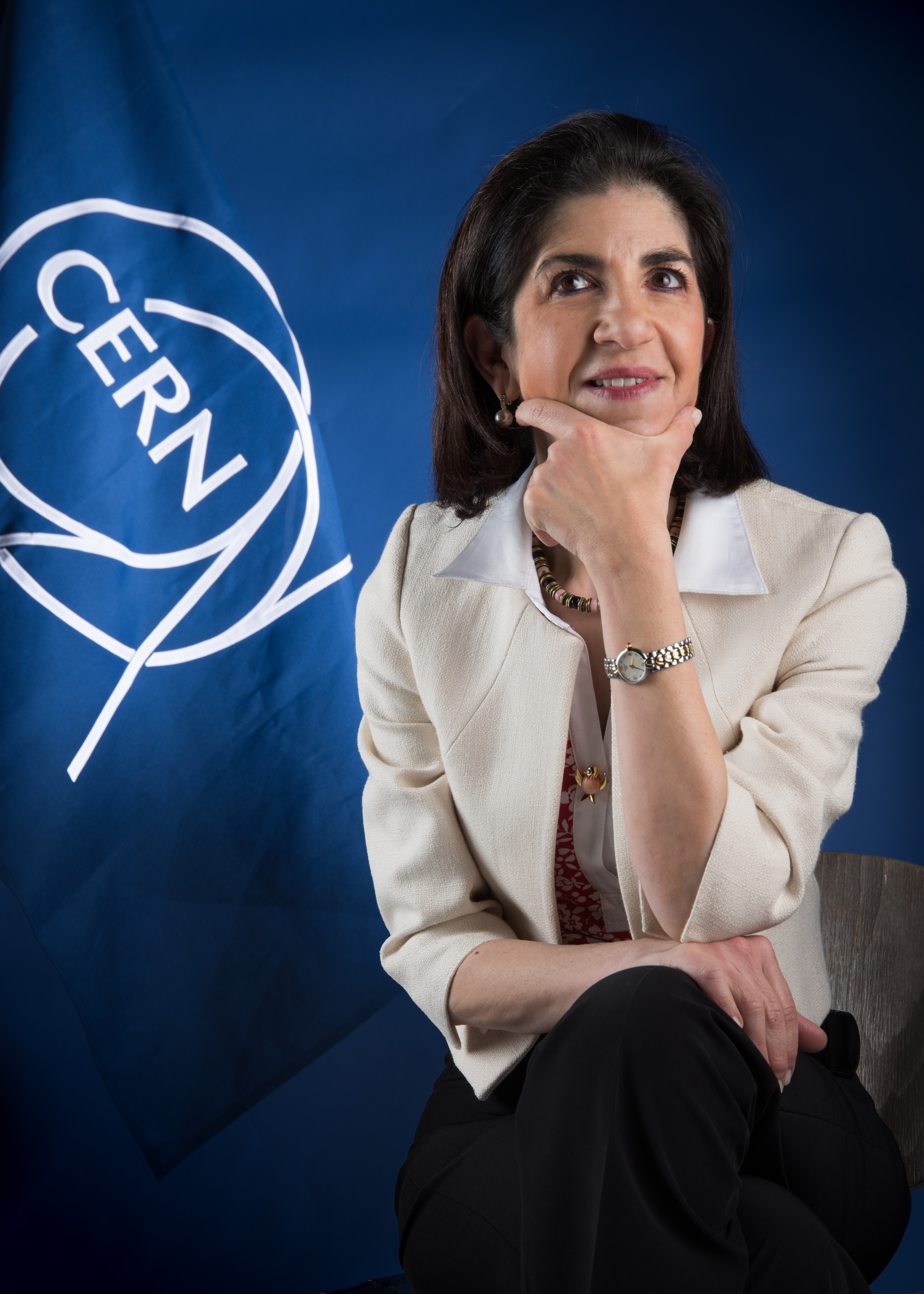
- Gianotti in 2015
- Born: 29 October 1960 (age 65); Rome, Italy
- Education: University of Milan
- Known for: ATLAS experiment; First female CERN Director-General; Higgs boson discovery
- Awards: Special Fundamental Physics Prize (2012); Foreign Associate of the National Academy of Sciences (2015); Wilhelm Exner Medal (2017); Bruno Pontecorvo Prize (2019)
- Scientific career
- Fields: Particle physics

Fabiola Gianotti (Italian: [faˈbiːola dʒaˈnɔtti]; born 29 October 1960) is an Italian experimental particle physicist who served as Director-General of the European Organization for Nuclear Research (CERN) from 2016 to 2026.

== Early life and education ==
From an early age, Gianotti was interested in nature and the world around her. Her mother, from Sicily, encouraged Gianotti in the fine arts. Her father, an acclaimed geologist from Piedmont, encouraged her early love of learning and encouraged her scientific interests.

Gianotti found her passion for scientific research after reading a biography of Marie Curie. Previously, she had studied the humanities, focusing on music and philosophy at the Liceo classico. Gianotti received a PhD in experimental particle physics from the Physics department of the University of Milan in 1989.

== Life and career ==
=== Academic and professional career ===
Since 1996, Gianotti has worked at CERN, starting with a fellowship and continuing to become a full-time research physicist. In 2009 she was promoted to project leader and Spokesperson of the ATLAS Collaboration. She also worked on the WA70, UA2 and ALEPH experiments at CERN, where she was involved in detector development, software development and data analysis. In 2016 she was elected to be the first female Director-General of CERN. She has since been reappointed for a second term, which ended in 2025.

She has been a member of several international committees, such as the Scientific Council of the CNRS in France, the Physics Advisory Committee of Fermilab in the US, the Council of the European Physical Society, the Scientific Council of the DESY Laboratory in Germany, and the Scientific Advisory Committee of NIKHEF in the Netherlands. She is a member of the Scientific Advisory Board of the UN Secretary-General. She was elected a Foreign Member of the Royal Society (ForMemRS) in 2018.

Gianotti is also a member of the Italian Academy of Sciences (Accademia Nazionale dei Lincei), a foreign associate member of the US National Academy of Sciences and foreign associate of the French Academy of Sciences. She was also elected a Member of the American Philosophical Society in 2019. Since 2013, she is an honorary professor at the University of Edinburgh. She is associated with the Experimental Particle Physics Group in the School of Physics and Astronomy and also a member of the International Advisory Committee of the Higgs Centre for Theoretical Physics at the University of Edinburgh.

Gianotti also appeared in the 2013 documentary film Particle Fever about work at the Large Hadron Collider at CERN.

Gianotti is a member of the Board of Trustees of the World Economic Forum.

Gianotti was appointed Director-General of CERN for a five-year term beginning on 1 January 2016, making her the first woman to hold the position. At its 195th Session in 2019, the CERN Council selected Gianotti for a second term as Director-General. This is the first time in CERN's history that a Director-General has been appointed for a full second term.

=== Higgs boson discovery ===
During Gianotti's time as project leader and spokesperson of ATLAS, the experiment was one of two involved in the observation of the Higgs boson. On 4 July 2012 Gianotti announced the discovery of the particle. Until the observation, the Higgs boson was a purely theoretical part of the Standard Model of particle physics. Gianotti's deep understanding of the ATLAS experiment, and her leadership, were recognised as major factors in the discovery.

=== Publications ===
Gianotti is the author or co-author of more than 500 publications in peer reviewed scientific journals. She has given more than 30 invited plenary talks at the major international conferences in the field.

Some of her most notable publications include "Observation of a New Particle in the Search for the Standard Model Higgs Boson with the ATLAS Detector at the LHC", where CERN presented the Higgs boson observation, "Searches for supersymmetry at high-energy colliders: the past, the present and the future" in the IOP Science, New Journal of Physics, and "Calorimetry for particle physics" in the APS Physics Journal.

=== Work environment ===
Gianotti had to push past barriers to be successful in a male-dominated field. In the European scientific community, for every one woman, there are two men. Only 20% of the team that worked on the ATLAS project were women. Gianotti was the first female Director-General of CERN, and she led two of the largest CERN experiments in 2012. She insists that she has never faced discrimination because of her gender, saying "I cannot say myself that I ever felt discriminated against ... Perhaps I was but I didn't realize it." Gianotti is helping break down barriers the male-dominated field created for aspiring female scientists. She specifically wants to give women more support when having children. She feels that she was never given enough support, and for this reason, never had children, a decision she now regrets.

=== Honours and awards ===
Gianotti was included among the 'Top 100 most inspirational women' by The Guardian newspaper in 2011, ranked fifth in Time magazine's 'Personality of the Year' in 2012, was the runner-up for Time magazine's 'Person of the Year' in the same year, was included among the 'Top 100 most influential women' by Forbes magazine in 2013, and was considered among the 'Leading Global Thinkers of 2013' by Foreign Policy magazine in 2013.

She has received honorary doctoral degrees from the University of Uppsala, École polytechnique fédérale de Lausanne (EPFL), McGill University, Oslo University, University of Edinburgh, University of Naples Federico II, University of Chicago, University of Savoy, Weizmann Institute of Science. University of Helsinki Nijmegen University University College Dublin and Aristotle University

- In December 2014, she was awarded the Order of Merit of the Italian Republic by the Italian president, Giorgio Napolitano.
- In September 2013, she was awarded the Enrico Fermi Prize of the Italian Physical Society.
- In November 2013, she was awarded the Niels Bohr Institute Medal of Honour.
- In December 2012, she was awarded the Breakthrough Prize in Fundamental Physics for her leadership role in the Higgs boson discovery.
- In December 2012, she was awarded the Gold Medal (known as "Ambrogino d'oro", named after the patron saint of Milan, Saint Ambrose) by the municipality of Milan.
- In 2018, she was listed as one of the BBC's 100 Women.
- In February 2020, she was awarded the Bruno Pontecorvo Prize (2019)
- In September 2020, she was named an ordinary member of the Pontifical Academy of Sciences by Pope Francis.

=== Comic Sans controversy ===
When CERN announced the discovery of the Higgs boson, some controversy sprang from Gianotti's use of the Comic Sans typeface in the presentation of the results. Alby Reid, a physicist, started an online petition calling for Microsoft to change the name of the font to Comic Cerns. Vincent Connare, the font's creator, tweeted support for the petition. Gianotti had used Comic Sans in previous presentations, but the controversy was generated due to the importance of the material presented.

== Personal life ==
Gianotti is a trained ballerina and plays the Piano. She has never been married; in a profile on Gianotti in The New York Times, the Dutch engineer Rende Steerenberg described her as someone who "has dedicated her life to physics... sure, she has made sacrifices."

In a 2010 interview, Gianotti said that she saw no contradiction between science and faith, and that they belong to "two different spheres". In an interview by la Repubblica, she said that "science and religion are separate disciplines, though not antithetical. You can be a physicist and have faith or not. It is better for God and science to keep the right distance."

As of September 2020, she is a member of the Italian Aspen Institute.

== See also ==
- Sabine Kraml, Austrian particle physicist and CERN scientist
