= Triazolopyridine =

Class of chemical compounds

Chemical structures of selected examples of triazolopyridine isomers and their IUPAC names

Triazolopyridines are a class of heterocyclic chemical compounds with a triazole ring fused to a pyridine ring. There are multiple isomers which differ by the location of the nitrogen atoms and the nature of the ring fusion.

The term triazolopyridine can also refer to a class of antidepressant drugs whose chemical structure includes a trazolopyridine-derived ring system. One example is trazodone.

Other pharmaceutical drugs that contain a triazolopyridine ring system include filgotinib, tucatinib, and enarodustat. In addition, the reagents used in organic chemistry HATU, HOAt, and PyAOP are triazolopyridine derivatives.
