= Astellas Pharma =

Japanese pharmaceutical company

Astellas Pharma Inc.
- Type: Public (K.K)
- Traded as: TYO: 4503; TOPIX Core 30 Component; TOPIX 100 Component; Nikkei 225 Component
- Industry: Pharmaceutical
- Predecessors: Yamanouchi Pharmaceutical; Fujisawa Pharmaceutical (Merged in 2005)
- Founded: 1 April 2005; 21 years ago
- Headquarters: 2-5-1, Nihonbashi-Honcho, Chūō-ku, Tokyo 103-8411, Japan
- Key people: Naoki Okamura (President and CEO); Kenji Yasukawa (Chairman of the Board)
- Products: Xtandi; Padcev; Xospata; Vyloy; Veozah; Izervay; Evrenzo; Betanis; Prograf and other pharmaceuticals
- Revenue: ▲US$11.418 billion (2023)
- Operating income: ▼US$1 billion (2023)
- Net income: ▼US$0.742 billion (2023)
- Total assets: ▼US$18.47 billion (2023)
- Total equity: ▼US$11.33 billion (2023)
- Number of employees: ▼14,484 (2023)
- Subsidiaries: Astellas US
- Website: www.astellas.com/en/

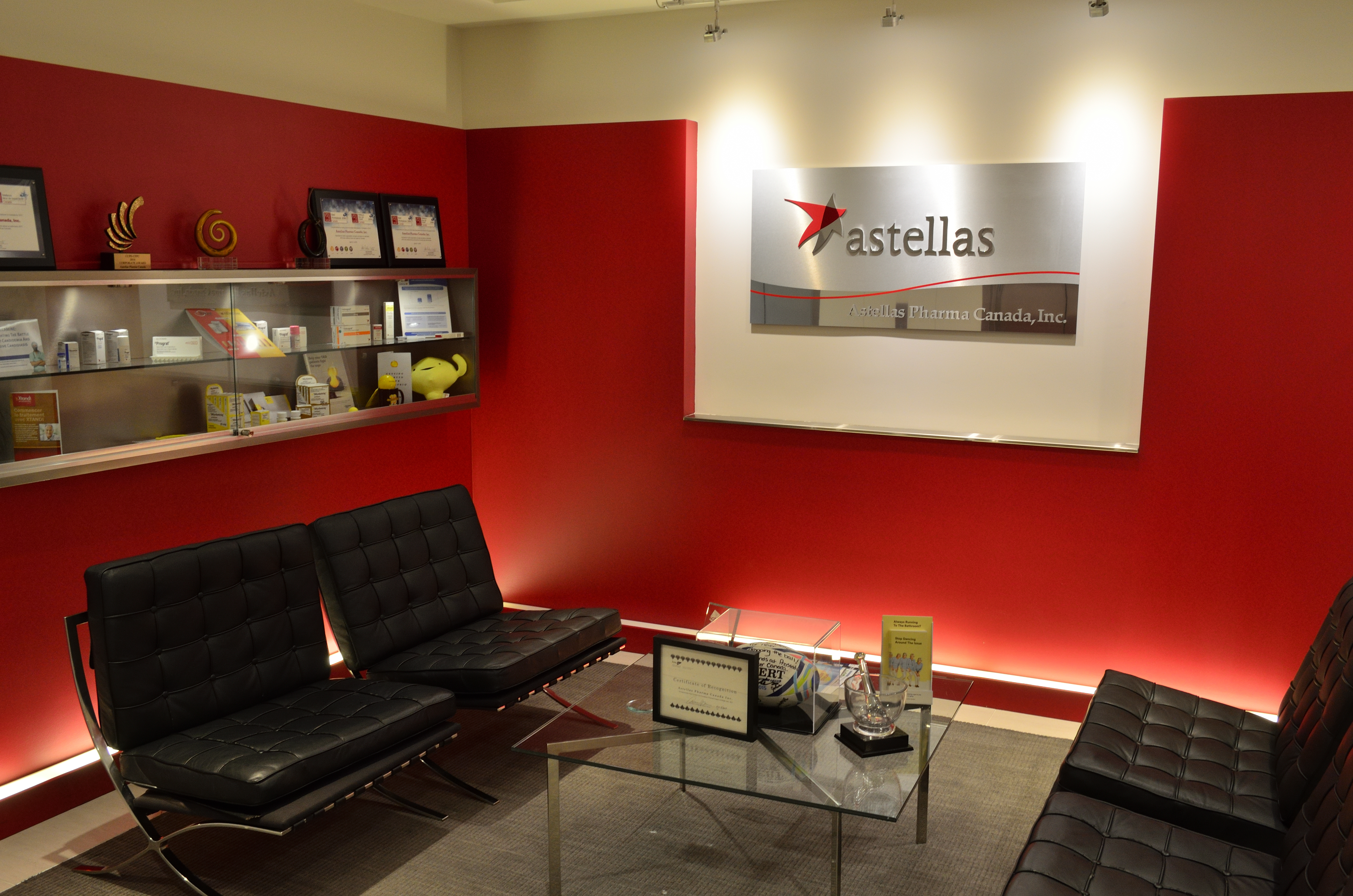
Astellas Pharma office in Canada

Astellas Pharma Inc. (アステラス製薬株式会社, Asuterasu Seiyaku Kabushiki-gaisha) is a Japanese multinational pharmaceutical company, formed on 1 April 2005 from the merger of Yamanouchi Pharmaceutical Co., Ltd. (山之内製薬株式会社, Yamanouchi Seiyaku Kabushiki-gaisha) and Fujisawa Pharmaceutical Co., Ltd. (藤沢薬品工業株式会社, Fujisawa Yakuhin Kōgyō Kabushiki-gaisha).

Astellas is a member of the Mitsubishi UFJ Financial Group (MUFJ) keiretsu.

== History ==
=== Early foundations ===
Fujisawa Shoten was started in 1894 by Tomokichi Fujisawa in Osaka, and was renamed Fujisawa Pharmaceutical Co. in 1943. Yamanouchi Yakuhin Shokai was started in 1923 by Kenji Yamanouchi in Osaka. The company was renamed Yamanouchi Pharmaceutical Co. in 1940 and moved to Tokyo in 1942. Both companies started their overseas expansion at about the same time, opening offices in Taiwan in 1962 and 1963, respectively, and in the United States and Europe from 1977 onwards.

=== Mergers and acquisitions ===
Fujisawa acquired Lyphomed in 1990 and thereafter established its US R&D center in Deerfield, Illinois. Yamanouchi's R&D center in Leiderdorp was established with the acquisition of the pharmaceutical division of Royal Gist Brocades in 1991. Fujisawa and Yamanouchi combined in a "merger of equals," forming Astellas Pharma on 1 April 2005. At least some of its older products continue to be distributed under the original brand, ostensibly due to high brand-name recognition. Astellas had a collaboration agreement with CoMentis from 2008 to 2014 focused on development of beta-secretase inhibitor therapeutics for Alzheimer's disease.

In 2009, the company's tacrolimus-containing products Prograf and Advagraf showed they were prone to dosing errors within Europe, leading to serious adverse reactions among a number of patients, due to deficits in packaging and labeling, deficits corrected after a warning from the UK MHRA.

On June 9, 2010, Astellas acquired OSI Pharmaceuticals for $4.0 billion. In December 2014, Astellas expanded its 18-month-old collaboration with Cytokinetics, focusing on the R&D and commercialization of skeletal muscle activators. The companies announced they will advance the development of CK-2127107 (a fast skeletal troponin activator) into Phase II clinical trials for the treatment of spinal muscular atrophy and possibly other neuromuscular conditions. The collaboration was expected to generate more than $600 million for Cytokinetics, as well as $75 million in milestone payments. In November 2015, the company announced its move to acquire Ocata Therapeutics (formerly Advanced Cell Technology) for $379 million. The deal was completed in February 2016. Later in November 2015 the company announced it would sell its dermatology business to LEO Pharma for $725 million. In October 2016 Astellas announced it would acquire Ganymed Pharmaceuticals for $1.4 billion

In March 2017, the company sold 16 of its drugs to LTL Pharma for ¥20.1 billion ($133 million). In April 2017, the company announced it would acquire Belgium-based drug discovery firm Ogeda for up to a total €800 million, strengthening its late-stage pipeline with Ogeda's drug candidate, fezolinetant. In November 2017, the company announced that it exercised an option to purchase Cambridge, Massachusetts-based Mitobridge, which is developing treatments for Duchenne muscular dystrophy and age-related diseases.

In August 2018, Astellas announced it would acquire Quethera Limited for $109 million. In December 2018, the company announced it would acquire Potenza Therapeutics, Inc.

In December 2019, Astellas Pharma announced it would buy Audentes Therapeutics Inc for approximately $3 billion in cash as well as acquiring Xyphos Biosciences, Inc later in the same month. Audentes will operate as a wholly owned subsidiary within Astellas, and will serve as the Center of Excellence for the newly created Genetic Regulation Primary Focus, providing leadership for AAV pipeline advancement through commercialization, manufacturing expansion, and next-generation research initiatives. The acquisition includes Astellas gaining Xyphos' Advanced Cellular Control through Engineered Ligands (ACCEL) technology platform.

On February 5, 2020, the company announced management changes effective from April 1, 2020.

Astellas Pharma's Smyraf (ingredient: peficitinib) obtained regulatory approval for the treatment of rheumatoid arthritis, the third oral Janus kinase (JAK) inhibitor to receive approval.

In October 2020, Astellas announced it would acquire iota Biosciences, Inc. for $127.5 million, with shareholders eligible to receive up to a further $176.5 million upon the achievement of predetermined milestones.

In May 2023, the business announced it would acquire Iveric Bio for $5.9 billion. In November, Astellas announced it would acquire Propella Therapeutics, Inc. and its lead androgen biosynthesis inhibitor abiraterone decanoate (PRL-02) used to treat prostate cancer.

=== Acquisition history ===
The following is an illustration of the company's major mergers and acquisitions and historical predecessors (this is not a comprehensive list):

- Astellas Pharma
  - Fujisawa Pharmaceutical Co
    - Fujisawa Pharmaceutical Co (Est 1894)
    - Lyphomed (Acq 1990)
  - Yamanouchi Pharmaceutical Co (Est 1923)
  - OSI Pharmaceuticals (Acq 2010)
  - Ocata Therapeutics (Acq 2016)
  - Ganymed Pharmaceuticals (Acq 2016)
  - Ogeda (Acq 2017)
  - Mitobridge (Acq 2017)
  - Quethera Limited (Acq 2018)
  - Potenza Therapeutics, Inc. (Acq 2018)
  - Audentes Therapeutics Inc. (Acq 2019)
  - Xyphos Biosciences, Inc. (Acq 2019)
  - iota Biosciences, Inc. (Acq 2020)
  - Iveric Bio (Acq 2023)

== Controversies ==
In June 2016, the Association of the British Pharmaceutical Industry (ABPI) gave Astellas a year-long suspension, after complaints it had "purposely misled the PMCPA (Prescription Medicines Code of Practice Authority)." In particular, Astellas had not fully disclosed the nature of a meeting which had purported to be a "genuine advisory board".

In May 2017, the ABPI extended the suspension by a further 12 months, based on findings that Astellas was not adequately overseeing and training nurses, and that it had failed to provide complete prescribing information for several medicines.

In June 2017, Astellas was reprimanded for "producing a large number of promotional materials, which had been used for a number of years, that did not include the required prescribing information related to some serious or common adverse reactions, warnings, and precautions, for a total of eight drugs".

In December 2018, the Prescription Medicines Code of Practice Authority (PMCPA) published their findings following an allegation that Astellas had "inappropriately awarded research funding" to a senior clinician at a British hospital, directly resulting in the hospital adopting a protocol which was subsequently abandoned less than three years later "because of poor outcomes". This report also reprimanded Astellas for failing to provide sufficient and timely information to investigators.

In April 2019, Astellas agreed to pay the United States Department of Justice $100 million to resolve allegations that it had conspired to offer kickbacks via Medicare copay foundations.

In March 2023, an employee of Astellas was detained in China by authorities for alleged espionage. The arrest was criticized by Japanese government as arbitrary.

== Business ==
Astellas' franchise areas are oncology, urology, immunology (transplantation), cardiology, and infectious disease. Priority areas for R&D are infectious diseases, diabetes, gastrointestinal diseases, oncology, and diseases of the central nervous system.

Recently noted, Astellas Venture Management has funded Oncorus, which recently raised $79.5 million in a series B financing round to move two oncolytic viruses through development.

=== Products ===
Some of the main products produced by Astellas include:

- Adenocard (adenosine injection) – Pharmacologic stress agent for myocardial perfusion scan
- Adenoscan (adenosine injection) – Pharmacologic stress agent for myocardial perfusion scan
- AmBisome (amphotericin B) – Anti-fungal – marketed with Gilead Sciences.
- Amevive (alefacept) – plaque psoriasis
- Astagraf XL (tacrolimus) – Prevention of post-transplant organ rejection
- Cresemba (isavuconazole) – Anti-fungal
- Evrenzo (roxadustat) - Anemia due to chronic kidney disease (CKD)
- Flomax (tamsulosin hydrochloride) – Benign prostatic hyperplasia (BPH)
  - Flomax MR capsules were discontinued in 2005, replaced by Flomaxtra XL, containing the same active ingredient
- Lexiscan (regadenoson injection) – Pharmacologic stress agent for myocardial perfusion scan
- Macugen (pegaptanib sodium) – Anti-angiogenic – marketed with Gilead Sciences in the US and Pfizer Outside of US.
- Mycamine (micafungin sodium) – Anti-fungal
- Myrbetriq (mirabegron) – Overactive bladder (OAB) – US only; marketed by Pfizer Outside of US.
- Padcev (enfortumab vedotin) - Bladder cancer
- Prograf (tacrolimus) – Prevention of post-transplant organ rejection
- Protopic (tacrolimus ointment) – Atopic dermatitis (eczema)
- Symoron (methadone HCL) – Opioid replacement therapy
- Tarceva (erlotinib) – Non-small cell lung cancer and pancreatic cancer – marketed with Hoffmann-La Roche (Genentech).
- Vaprisol (conivaptan) – Hyponatremia
- Veozah (fezolinetant) - Hot Flashes (vasomotor symptoms) due to menopause
- Vesicare (solifenacin succinate) – Overactive bladder (OAB)
- Vibativ (telavancin) – bactericidal lipoglycopeptide – marketed with Theravance.
- Xospata (gilteritinib) – AXL receptor tyrosine kinase
- Xtandi (enzalutamide) – Prostate cancer – marketed with Pfizer.

The US Food and Drug Administration (FDA) has granted priority review to Astellas Pharma's biologics licence application (BLA) for Zolbetuximab, a monoclonal antibody targeting Claudin 18.2 (CLDN18.2), for the treatment of HER2-negative gastric or gastroesophageal junction adenocarcinoma. Zolbetuximab is the first treatment of its kind in the region, and a decision on its approval is expected by 12 January 2024, based on the Phase III SPOTLIGHT and GLOW clinical trial results.

=== Distribution agreements ===
In 2007, the company narrowed UK distribution of Advagraf and Prograf to a sole distributor, UniChem, in reaction to pharmacist complaints about drug availability from wholesale sources. This narrow distribution was revised to three firms in 2010, covering all of its products in the UK: AAH, Alliance Healthcare, and Phoenix Healthcare Distribution.

== Operations ==
The company's headquarters are in Tokyo, with research centers in Tsukuba and Osaka. Clinical development is centered in Northbrook, Illinois, La Jolla, California, and Leiden, Netherlands. Combined revenues of the two pre-merger companies were $7.9 billion in 2004. Worldwide the company employs about 17,000 people. The United States subsidiary of Astellas is Astellas US LLC.

The company's advertising slogans are:

- English: Leading Light for Life
- Japanese: Ashita wa kaerareru. (明日は変えられる。, Changing Tomorrow.)

== See also ==
- Zeria Pharmaceutical
