= Gilteritinib =

Chemical compound

Clinical data
- Trade names: Xospata
- AHFS/Drugs.com: Monograph
- MedlinePlus: a619003
- License data: US DailyMed: Gilteritinib
- Pregnancy category: AU: D
- Routes of administration: By mouth
- ATC code: L01EX13 (WHO)

Legal status
- Legal status: AU: S4 (Prescription only); CA: ℞-only; UK: POM (Prescription only); US: ℞-only; EU: Rx-only; In general: ℞ (Prescription only)

Identifiers
- IUPAC name: 6-Ethyl-3-[3-methoxy-4-[4-(4-methylpiperazin-1-yl)piperidin-1-yl]anilino]-5-(oxan-4-ylamino)pyrazine-2-carboxamide
- CAS Number: 1254053-43-4
- PubChem CID: 49803313
- DrugBank: DB12141
- ChemSpider: 32055842
- UNII: 66D92MGC8M
- KEGG: D10709; as salt: D10800
- ChEBI: CHEBI:145372
- CompTox Dashboard (EPA): DTXSID701027949

Chemical and physical data
- Formula: C_{29}H_{44}N_{8}O_{3}
- Molar mass: 552.724 g·mol^{−1}
- 3D model (JSmol): Interactive image
- SMILES: CCc1nc(C(=O)N)c(Nc2ccc(N3CCC(CC3)N4CCN(C)CC4)c(OC)c2)nc1NC5CCOCC5
- InChI: InChI=1S/C29H44N8O3/c1-4-23-28(31-20-9-17-40-18-10-20)34-29(26(33-23)27(30)38)32-21-5-6-24(25(19-21)39-3)37-11-7-22(8-12-37)36-15-13-35(2)14-16-36/h5-6,19-20,22H,4,7-18H2,1-3H3,(H2,30,38)(H2,31,32,34); Key:GYQYAJJFPNQOOW-UHFFFAOYSA-N

Gilteritinib, sold under the brand name Xospata, is an anti-cancer drug.

== Mechanism of action ==
Gilteritinib acts as an inhibitor of FLT3, hence it is a tyrosine kinase inhibitor.

== History ==
Gilteritinib was developed by Astellas Pharma.

In April 2018, Astellas filed a new drug application with the Food and Drug Administration for gilteritinib for the treatment of adult patients with FLT3 mutation–positive (both ITD and TKD) relapsed or refractory acute myeloid leukemia (AML).

In November 2018, the FDA approved gilteritinib for treatment of adult patients with relapsed or refractory acute myeloid leukemia (AML) with a FLT3 mutation as detected by an FDA-approved test. It is effective beyond second line of therapy.

Gilteritinib was granted orphan drug status by the U.S. FDA, the European Commission (EC) and the Japan Ministry of Health, Labor and Welfare, for some AML patients.

Gilteritinib was approved for medical use in Australia in March 2020.
