= Pamrevlumab =

Monoclonal antibody

Monoclonal antibody
- Type: ?
- Source: Human
- Target: CTGF

Clinical data
- Other names: FG-3019
- ATC code: none

Identifiers
- CAS Number: 946415-13-0
- ChemSpider: none
- UNII: QS5F6VTS0O
- KEGG: D10969

Chemical and physical data
- Formula: C_{6492}H_{10018}N_{1718}O_{2086}S_{48}
- Molar mass: 147050.38 g·mol^{−1}

Pamrevlumab (INN; development code FG-3019) is a humanized monoclonal antibody designed for the treatment of idiopathic pulmonary fibrosis and pancreatic cancer. It binds to the connective tissue growth factor (CTGF) protein.

This drug was developed by FibroGen.
