= Sabine Kraml =

Austrian physicist

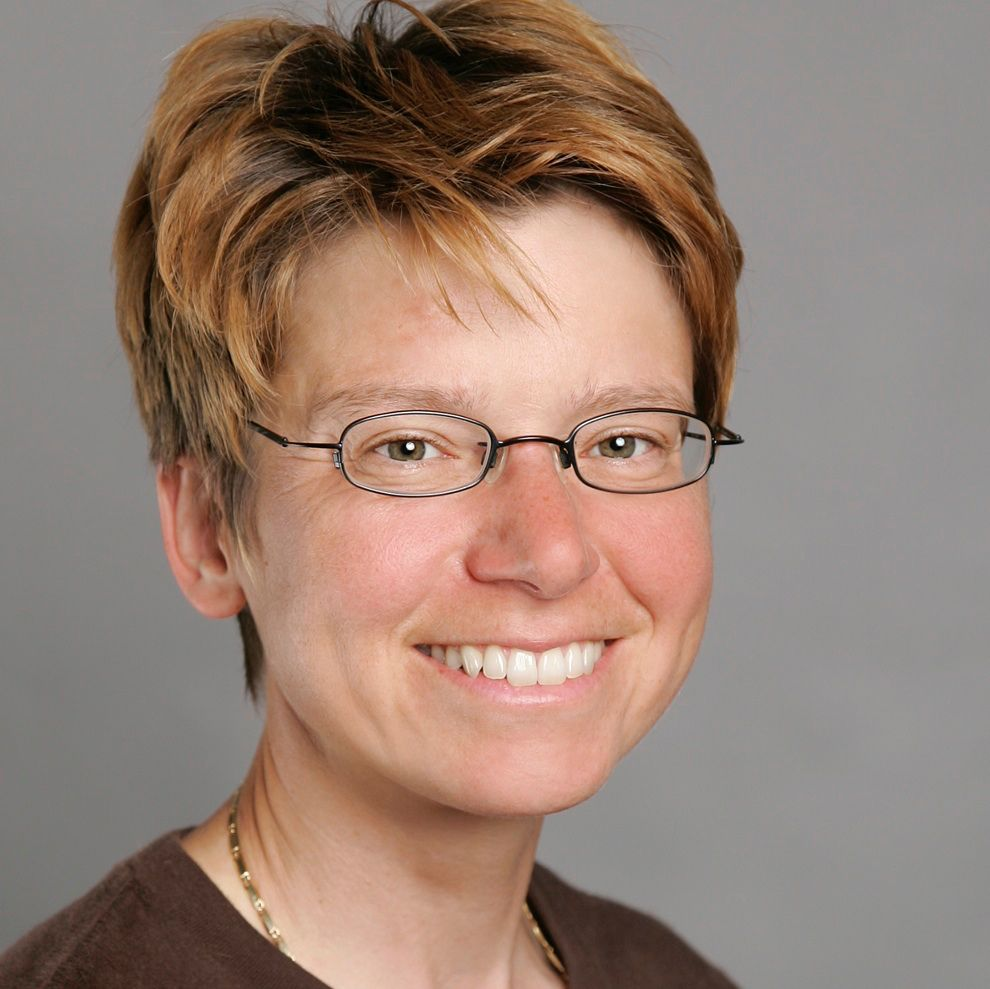
- Born: July 19, 1971 (age 55); Steyr, Austria
- Education: TU Wien
- Scientific career
- Fields: Theoretical high energy physics
- Workplaces: Austrian Academy of Sciences, University of Innsbruck, CNRS, LPSC
- Thesis: (1999)
- Doctoral advisor: Dr. Walter Majerotto

Sabine Kraml (born 19 July 1971 in Steyr) is an Austrian physicist, specializing in theoretical high energy physics.

== Education and career ==
In 1994, Kraml received the degree of Diplomingenieur (equivalent to a master's degree) and in 1999 her Ph.D., both from the TU Wien. The Ph.D. was carried out at the Institute of High Energy Physics (HEPHY) of the Austrian Academy of Sciences with Dr. Walter Majerotto as doctoral advisor. After a further year at the HEPHY, she worked from 2001 to 2007 as a postdoc at CERN. In 2007, she obtained her habilitation from the University of Innsbruck. In the same year, she was hired at the French CNRS and moved to the LPSC in Grenoble, France, where she is still today.

Her research deals with physics beyond the Standard Model, in particular the phenomenology of weak-scale supersymmetry at colliders, non-standard Higgs physics and particle dark matter. Most of her publications relate directly to experiment, from computing the effects of new physics, to interpreting measurements and the results of searches for new particles. An advocate of open science, she has co-initiated and co-led several initiatives regarding the publication and reuse of LHC results. She has been co-developing public software tools for the interpretation of LHC results.

In 2008 she was elected `young member' of the Austrian Academy of Sciences (appointment for 10 years). In 2012 she was promoted to the rank of research director of the CNRS 2nd class (DR2) and in 2018 to 1st class (DR1). In 2024, she was proposed for promotion to `Exceptional class' (DRCE1) by both CNRS sections 01 and 02.

== Personal life ==
In private life, she is a mountaineer and martial arts practitioner.

== See also ==
- Fabiola Gianotti, particle physicist and director at CERN
