= Ferrous tartrate =

Names
- IUPAC name Iron(II) (2R,3R)-2,3-dihydroxybutanedioate
- Other names: Iron wine; Ferrous tartrate; Vinum Ferri

Identifiers
CAS Number	2944-65-2
3D model (JSmol)	Interactive image
ChemSpider	4954134
ECHA InfoCard	100.019.046
PubChem CID	6451676
UNII	ZRW631PTZD
CompTox Dashboard (EPA)	DTXSID301019697 DTXSID80961382, DTXSID301019697
- InChI: InChI=1S/C4H6O6.Fe/c5-1(3(7)8)2(6)4(9)10;/h1-2,5-6H,(H,7,8)(H,9,10);/q;+2/p-2/t1-,2-;/m1./s1
- SMILES: C(C(C(=O)[O-])O)(C(=O)[O-])O.[Fe+2]

Properties
Chemical formula	C_{4}H_{4}FeO_{6}
Molar mass	203.92 g/mol
Appearance	Reddish powder

Pharmacology
ATC code	B03AA08 (WHO)
Pregnancy category	N (US)
Routes of administration	Oral
- Pharmacokinetics
Bioavailability	yes
Legal status	CA: OTC; UK: General sales list (GSL, OTC); US: OTC
- Except where otherwise noted, data are given for materials in their standard state (at 25 °C [77 °F], 100 kPa). Infobox references

Ferrous tartrate is a chemical compound and the iron(II) salt of tartaric acid.

== Historical uses ==
Ferrous tartrate has been used as a steel medicine. It was generally prescribed during the 19th and early 20th centuries. It is usually prepared by digesting for 30 days, 2 ounces (880 grains) tartarated iron in a pint of sherry. It can be difficult to prepare.

Historically, it was used as a stomachic and tonic, at a dose of 2 tbsp. It was also used to treat anemia, dose 1 to 2 fl. dr.
