= Iron(II) fumarate =

Names
- IUPAC name Iron(2+) (2E)-but-2-enedioate
- Other names Ferrous fumarate; Feostat

Identifiers
CAS Number	141-01-5
3D model (JSmol)	Interactive image
ChEMBL	ChEMBL1200640
ChemSpider	10607713
ECHA InfoCard	100.004.953
PubChem CID	6433164
UNII	R5L488RY0Q
CompTox Dashboard (EPA)	DTXSID7047148
- InChI: InChI=1S/C4H4O4.Fe/c5-3(6)1-2-4(7)8;/h1-2H,(H,5,6)(H,7,8);/q;+2/p-2/b2-1+; Key: PMVSDNDAUGGCCE-TYYBGVCCSA-L; InChI=1/C4H4O4.Fe/c5-3(6)1-2-4(7)8;/h1-2H,(H,5,6)(H,7,8);/q;+2/p-2/b2-1+; Key: PMVSDNDAUGGCCE-FMKVMNOJBF
- SMILES: [Fe+2].[O-]C(=O)/C=C/C([O-])=O

Properties
Chemical formula	C_{4}H_{2}FeO_{4}
Molar mass	169.901 g·mol^{−1}
Appearance	reddish-brown powder
Odor	odorless
Density	2.435 g/cm^{3} (20 °C)
Melting point	280 °C (536 °F; 553 K)
Solubility in water	slightly soluble

Pharmacology
ATC code	B03AA02 (WHO)

Hazards
NFPA 704 (fire diamond)	1 0 0
- Lethal dose or concentration (LD, LC)
LD_{50} (median dose)	3850 mg/kg (oral, rat)
- Except where otherwise noted, data are given for materials in their standard state (at 25 °C [77 °F], 100 kPa). verify (what is ?) Infobox references

Iron(II) fumarate, also known as ferrous fumarate, is the iron(II) salt of fumaric acid, occurring as a reddish-orange powder, used to supplement iron intake. It has the chemical formula C_{4}H_{2}FeO_{4}.

== Iron supplement ==
Ferrous fumarate is often taken orally as an iron supplement to treat or prevent iron deficiency anemia. Mixtures of ferrous fumarate and potassium iodate, "double fortified salt", are used to address both iron and iodine deficiencies.

Pure ferrous fumarate has an iron content of 32.87%, therefore one tablet of 300 mg iron fumarate will contain 98.6 mg of iron (548% Daily Value based on 18 mg RDI). It is recommended to store ferrous fumarate at 15-25°C in moisture-proof containers. Normally, it has a shelf life of 36 months.

== See also ==
- Iron - Nutrition
