= HIF3A =

Protein-coding gene in the species Homo sapiens

Identifiers
- Aliases: HIF3A, HIF-3A, IPAS, MOP7, PASD7, bHLHe17, HIF3-alpha-1, hypoxia inducible factor 3 alpha subunit, hypoxia inducible factor 3 subunit alpha
- External IDs: OMIM: 609976; MGI: 1859778; GeneCards: HIF3A
Available structures
PDB	Ortholog search: PDBe RCSB
PDB	List of PDB id codes 4WN5

Gene location (Human)
Chr.	Chromosome 19 (human)
Band	19q13.32	Start	46,297,042 bp
Band	19q13.32	End	46,343,433 bp

Gene location (Mouse)
Chr.	Chromosome 7 (mouse)
Band	7|7 A2	Start	16,765,432 bp
Band	7|7 A2	End	16,796,352 bp
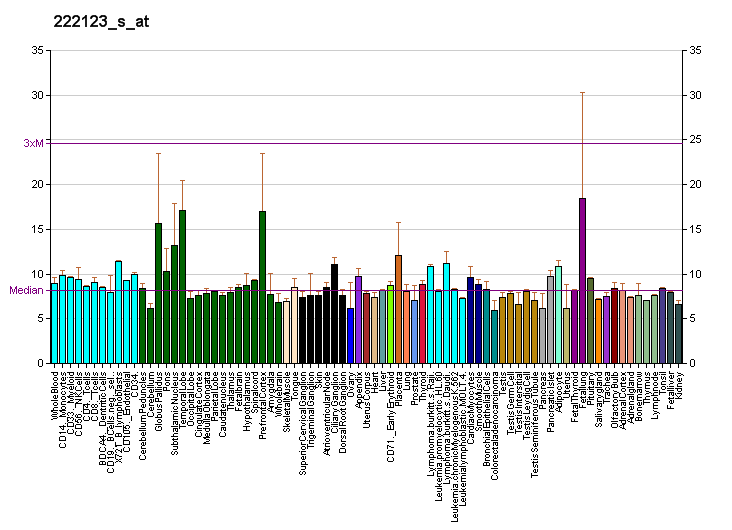

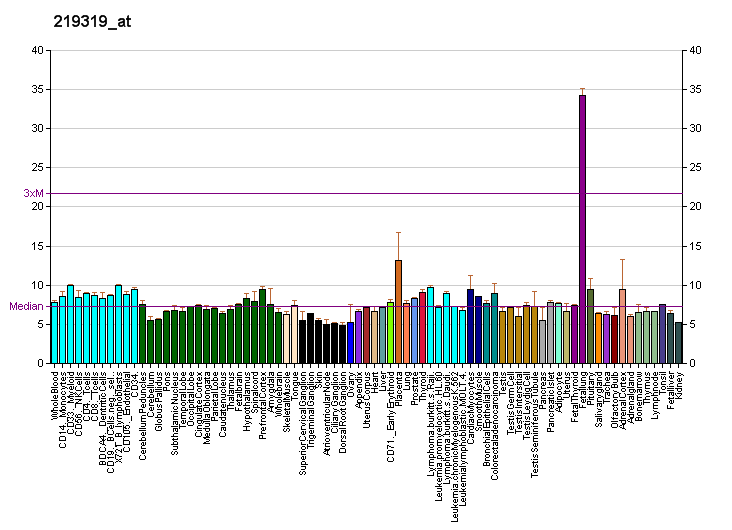
RNA expression pattern
Bgee	Human / Mouse (ortholog); Top expressed in: gastric mucosa; apex of heart; right lung; left uterine tube; muscle layer of sigmoid colon; right auricle of heart; sural nerve; left ventricle; popliteal artery; tibial arteries / Top expressed in: fetal liver hematopoietic progenitor cell; left lung lobe; external carotid artery; internal carotid artery; fossa; human fetus; atrium; efferent ductule; umbilical cord; migratory enteric neural crest cell; More reference expression data
BioGPS	More reference expression data
Gene ontology
Molecular function	DNA binding; protein dimerization activity; transcription corepressor activity; DNA-binding transcription factor activity; transcription coactivator activity; DNA-binding transcription factor activity, RNA polymerase II-specific
Cellular component	cytoplasm; nuclear speck; mitochondrion; nucleoplasm; cytosol; plasma membrane; nucleus
Biological process	response to hypoxia; regulation of transcription, DNA-templated; regulation of transcription by RNA polymerase II; transcription by RNA polymerase II; transcription, DNA-templated; multicellular organism development; angiogenesis; regulation of transcription from RNA polymerase II promoter in response to hypoxia; positive regulation of transcription by RNA polymerase II; apoptotic process; negative regulation of nucleic acid-templated transcription; cellular response to hypoxia; post-translational protein modification; positive regulation of nucleic acid-templated transcription; protein ubiquitination
Sources:Amigo / QuickGO
Orthologs
Databases	NCBI: entry; OMA: entry
Species	Human	Mouse
Entrez	64344	53417
Ensembl	ENSG00000124440	ENSMUSG00000004328
UniProt	Q9Y2N7	Q0VBL6
RefSeq (mRNA)	NM_022462; NM_152794; NM_152795; NM_152796	NM_001162950; NM_016868
RefSeq (protein)	NP_071907; NP_690007; NP_690008; NP_690009	NP_001156422; NP_058564
Location (UCSC)	Chr 19: 46.3 – 46.34 Mb	Chr 7: 16.77 – 16.8 Mb
PubMed search
- Wikidata
View/Edit Human	View/Edit Mouse

Hypoxia-inducible factor 3 alpha is a protein that in humans is encoded by the HIF3A gene.

== Function ==
The protein encoded by this gene is the alpha-3 subunit of one of several alpha/beta-subunit heterodimeric transcription factors that regulate many adaptive responses to low oxygen tension (hypoxia). The alpha-3 subunit lacks the transactivation domain found in factors containing either the alpha-1 or alpha-2 subunits. It is thought that factors containing the alpha-3 subunit are negative regulators of hypoxia-inducible gene expression. At least three transcript variants encoding three different isoforms have been found for this gene.

In rats, it plays a negative role in the adaptation to hypoxia, because the inhibition of HIF-3α expression leads to an increase in physical endurance.

== Clinical significance ==
DNA methylation in the introns of HIF3A is associated with BMI an adiposity.

== See also ==
- Hypoxia inducible factors
