= Astellas Pharma espionage case in China =

2023 espionage charge in China

- Date: March 2023 (arrest)
- Location: Beijing, China
- Suspects: Japanese Astellas Pharma male employee in his 50s
- Charges: Espionage

In March 2023, a male employee of the Japanese firm Astellas Pharma was detained by authorities in China and later charged him of espionage charges.

== Detention ==
In March 2023, China has notified the Japanese government that it has detained a man in his 50s for suspected espionage. Japanese firm Astellas Pharma confirmed the man to be its employees. The Asahi Shimbun reported that the man was last seen on March 20 prior to the announcement of his detention. According to the Japanese newspaper's sources, the man left for the airport from his hotel in Beijing after finishing his assignment in China.

The man has been working for 20 years in China and a former senior official of the Japanese Chamber Commerce and Industry in the country.

The Astellas employee was formally arrested in October 2023 and indicted for espionage in mid-August 2024.

== Trial ==
The first trial involving the Astellas Pharma was heard in a court in Beijing in November 2024.

== Impact ==
The arrest has strained China–Japan relations. Japanese companies have curtailed business trips to China in response to the arrest. Japanese scholars specializing in Chinese politics and military affairs also began limiting visits to China, resorting to attending online symposiums.
