= ARNT2 =

Protein-coding gene in the species Homo sapiens

Identifiers
- Aliases: ARNT2, WEDAS, bHLHe1, aryl hydrocarbon receptor nuclear translocator 2
- External IDs: OMIM: 606036; MGI: 107188; GeneCards: ARNT2

Gene location (Human)
Chr.	Chromosome 15 (human)
Band	15q25.1	Start	80,404,350 bp
Band	15q25.1	End	80,597,933 bp

Gene location (Mouse)
Chr.	Chromosome 7 (mouse)
Band	7 D3|7 48.35 cM	Start	83,895,486 bp
Band	7 D3|7 48.35 cM	End	84,059,384 bp
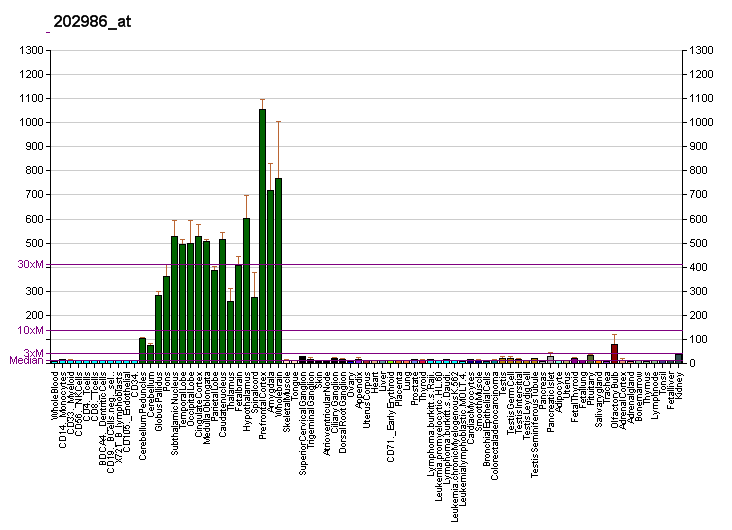
RNA expression pattern
Bgee	Human / Mouse (ortholog); Top expressed in: external globus pallidus; middle temporal gyrus; frontal pole; middle frontal gyrus; Brodmann area 10; entorhinal cortex; optic nerve; superior vestibular nucleus; parietal lobe; ventral tegmental area / Top expressed in: subiculum; superior frontal gyrus; paraventricular nucleus of hypothalamus; globus pallidus; nucleus accumbens; dorsal tegmental nucleus; dorsomedial hypothalamic nucleus; ganglionic eminence; ventral tegmental area; dentate gyrus of hippocampal formation granule cell; More reference expression data
BioGPS	More reference expression data
Gene ontology
Molecular function	DNA binding; protein dimerization activity; DNA-binding transcription factor activity; aryl hydrocarbon receptor binding; DNA-binding transcription activator activity, RNA polymerase II-specific; RNA polymerase II cis-regulatory region sequence-specific DNA binding; protein binding; protein heterodimerization activity; DNA-binding transcription factor activity, RNA polymerase II-specific
Cellular component	cytoplasm; transcription regulator complex; nucleus; nucleoplasm
Biological process	response to estradiol; response to hypoxia; regulation of transcription, DNA-templated; negative regulation of apoptotic process; in utero embryonic development; transcription by RNA polymerase II; transcription, DNA-templated; positive regulation of transcription, DNA-templated; central nervous system development; brain development; positive regulation of cell population proliferation; xenobiotic metabolic process; positive regulation of transcription by RNA polymerase II
Sources:Amigo / QuickGO
Orthologs
Databases	NCBI: entry; OMA: entry
Species	Human	Mouse
Entrez	9915	11864
Ensembl	ENSG00000172379	ENSMUSG00000015709
UniProt	Q9HBZ2	Q61324
RefSeq (mRNA)	NM_014862	NM_007488
RefSeq (protein)	NP_055677; NP_055677.3	NP_031514
Location (UCSC)	Chr 15: 80.4 – 80.6 Mb	Chr 7: 83.9 – 84.06 Mb
PubMed search
- Wikidata
View/Edit Human	View/Edit Mouse

Aryl hydrocarbon receptor nuclear translocator 2 is a protein that in humans is encoded by the ARNT2 gene.

This gene encodes a member of the basic-helix-loop-helix-Per-Arnt-Sim (bHLH-PAS) superfamily of transcription factors. The encoded protein acts as a partner for several sensor proteins of the bHLH-PAS family, forming heterodimers with the sensor proteins that bind regulatory DNA sequences in genes responsive to developmental and environmental stimuli. Under hypoxic conditions, the encoded protein complexes with hypoxia-inducible factor 1alpha in the nucleus and this complex binds to hypoxia-responsive elements in enhancers and promoters of oxygen-responsive genes. A highly similar protein in mouse forms functional complexes with both aryl hydrocarbon receptors and Single-minded proteins, suggesting addition roles for the encoded protein in the metabolism of xenobiotic compounds and the regulation of neurogenesis, respectively.
