= ATC code B03 =

ATC code B03 Antianemic preparations is a therapeutic subgroup of the Anatomical Therapeutic Chemical Classification System, a system of alphanumeric codes developed by the World Health Organization (WHO) for the classification of drugs and other medical products. Subgroup B03 is part of the anatomical group B Blood and blood forming organs.

Codes for veterinary use (ATCvet codes) can be created by placing the letter Q in front of the human ATC code: for example, QB03. ATCvet codes without corresponding human ATC codes are cited with the leading Q in the following list.
National versions of the ATC classification may include additional codes not present in this list, which follows the WHO version.

== B03A Iron preparations ==
=== B03AA Iron bivalent, oral preparations ===
B03AA01 Ferrous glycine sulfate
B03AA02 Ferrous fumarate
B03AA03 Ferrous gluconate
B03AA04 Ferrous carbonate
B03AA05 Ferrous chloride
B03AA06 Ferrous succinate
B03AA07 Ferrous sulfate
B03AA08 Ferrous tartrate
B03AA09 Ferrous aspartate
B03AA10 Ferrous ascorbate
B03AA11 Ferrous iodine
B03AA12 Ferrous sodium citrate

=== B03AB Iron trivalent, oral preparations ===
B03AB01 Ferric sodium citrate
B03AB02 Saccharated iron oxide
B03AB03 Sodium feredetate
B03AB04 Ferric hydroxide
B03AB05 Ferric oxide polymaltose complexes
B03AB07 Chondroitin sulfate-iron complex
B03AB08 Ferric acetyl transferrin
B03AB09 Ferric proteinsuccinylate
B03AB10 Ferric maltol
QB03AB90 Iron dextran complexes

=== B03AC Iron, parenteral preparations ===
Empty group

=== B03AD Iron in combination with folic acid ===
B03AD01 Ferrous amino acid complex and folic acid
B03AD02 Ferrous fumarate and folic acid
B03AD03 Ferrous sulfate and folic acid
B03AD04 Ferric oxide polymaltose complexes and folic acid
B03AD05 Ferrous gluconate and folic acid

=== B03AE Iron in other combinations ===
B03AE01 Iron, vitamin B_{12} and folic acid
B03AE02 Iron, multivitamins and folic acid
B03AE03 Iron and multivitamins
B03AE04 Iron, multivitamins and minerals
B03AE10 Various combinations

== B03B Vitamin B_{12} and folic acid ==
=== B03BA Vitamin B_{12} (cyanocobalamin and analogues) ===
B03BA01 Cyanocobalamin
B03BA02 Cyanocobalamin tannin complex
B03BA03 Hydroxocobalamin
B03BA04 Cobamamide
B03BA05 Mecobalamin
B03BA51 Cyanocobalamin, combinations
B03BA53 Hydroxocobalamin, combinations

=== B03BB Folic acid and derivatives ===
B03BB01 Folic acid
B03BB51 Folic acid, combinations

== B03X Other antianemic preparations ==
=== B03XA Other antianemic preparations ===
B03XA01 Erythropoietin
B03XA02 Darbepoetin alfa
B03XA03 Methoxy polyethylene glycol-epoetin beta
B03XA04 Peginesatide
B03XA05 Roxadustat
B03XA06 Luspatercept
B03XA07 Daprodustat
B03XA08 Vadadustat
B03XA09 Molidustat
B03XA10 Efepoetin alfa
