= Molidustat =

Chemical compound

Clinical data
- Trade names: Varenzin-CA1
- Other names: Bay 85-3934
- Routes of administration: By mouth
- ATC code: B03XA09 (WHO)

Legal status
- Legal status: US: ℞-only

Identifiers
- IUPAC name: 2-(6-Morpholin-4-ylpyrimidin-4-yl)-4-(triazol-1-yl)-1H-pyrazol-3-one
- CAS Number: 1154028-82-6; 1375799-59-9
- PubChem CID: 59603622
- DrugBank: DB15642; DBSALT002944
- ChemSpider: 30922476; 32699298
- UNII: 9JH486CZ13; CI0NE7C96T
- KEGG: D12122
- ChEMBL: ChEMBL3646118
- PDB ligand: A1H (PDBe, RCSB PDB)
- CompTox Dashboard (EPA): DTXSID80151089
- ECHA InfoCard: 100.248.923

Chemical and physical data
- Formula: C_{13}H_{14}N_{8}O_{2}
- Molar mass: 314.309 g·mol^{−1}
- 3D model (JSmol): Interactive image
- SMILES: C1COCCN1C2=NC=NC(=C2)N3C(=O)C(=CN3)N4C=CN=N4
- InChI: InChI=1S/C13H14N8O2/c22-13-10(20-2-1-16-18-20)8-17-21(13)12-7-11(14-9-15-12)19-3-5-23-6-4-19/h1-2,7-9,17H,3-6H2; Key:IJMBOKOTALXLKS-UHFFFAOYSA-N

Molidustat is a drug which acts as an HIF prolyl-hydroxylase inhibitor and thereby increases endogenous production of erythropoietin, which stimulates production of hemoglobin and red blood cells. It is in Phase III clinical trials for the treatment of anemia caused by chronic kidney disease. Due to its potential applications in athletic doping, it has also been incorporated into screens for performance-enhancing drugs.

== Veterinary use ==
Molidustat is indicated for the control of nonregenerative anemia associated with chronic kidney disease in cats. The US Food and Drug Administration (FDA) conditionally approved it in May 2023.

The reasonable expectation of effectiveness of Molidustat was evaluated in a study conducted in two phases. The first phase involved a multi-center, double-masked, randomized, placebo-controlled field effectiveness and safety study. The second phase was an unmasked, optional continuation of the field study. The study enrolled 23 cats from 4 to 17 years of age from various breeds or breed mixes diagnosed with nonregenerative anemia associated with chronic kidney disease. The FDA granted conditional approval of Varenzin-CA1 to Elanco US Inc.
