= Enarodustat =

Chemical compound

Clinical data
- Trade names: Enaroy
- Other names: JTZ-951

Legal status
- Legal status: Rx-only (Japan)

Identifiers
- IUPAC name: 2-{[7-Hydroxy-5-(2-phenylethyl)-[1,2,4]triazolo[1,5-a]pyridin-8-yl]formamido}acetic acid
- CAS Number: 1262132-81-9
- PubChem CID: 50899324
- DrugBank: 14985
- ChemSpider: 64835234
- UNII: JSK7TUA223
- KEGG: D11523
- ChEMBL: ChEMBL4297619

Chemical and physical data
- Formula: C_{17}H_{16}N_{4}O_{4}
- Molar mass: 340.339 g·mol^{−1}
- 3D model (JSmol): Interactive image
- SMILES: C1=CC=C(C=C1)CCC2=CC(=O)C(=C3N2NC=N3)C(=O)NCC(=O)O
- InChI: InChI=1S/C17H16N4O4/c22-13-8-12(7-6-11-4-2-1-3-5-11)21-16(19-10-20-21)15(13)17(25)18-9-14(23)24/h1-5,8,10H,6-7,9H2,(H,18,25)(H,19,20)(H,23,24); Key:FJYRBJKWDXVHHO-UHFFFAOYSA-N

Enarodustat (development code JTZ-951; brand name Enaroy) is a drug used for the treatment of anemia, especially when associated with chronic kidney disease (CKD). Enarodustat functions as a inhibitor of hypoxia inducible factor-proly hydroxylase (HIF-PH).

The drug was approved in September 2020 in Japan for anemia associated with CKD and is currently in clinical development in the United States and South Korea. The drug is being developed by Japan Tobacco and JW Pharmaceutical.
