= Iron(II) gluconate =

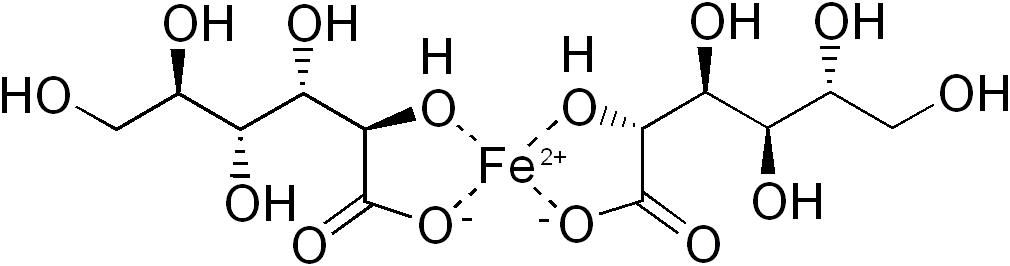

Names
- Systematic IUPAC name Iron; (2R,3R,4S,5S)-2,3,4,5,6-pentahydroxyhexanoic acid
- Other names: Ferrous gluconate

Identifiers
| CAS Number | 299-29-6 |
| 3D model (JSmol) | Interactive image |
| ChEMBL | ChEMBL3833303 |
| ChemSpider | 19953133 |
| ECHA InfoCard | 100.131.978 |
| EC Number | 206-076-3 |
| E number | E579 (acidity regulators, ...) |
| PubChem CID | 23616740 |
| UNII | 781E2AXH0K |
- InChI: InChI=1S/2C6H12O7.Fe/c2*7-1-2(8)3(9)4(10)5(11)6(12)13;/h2*2-5,7-11H,1H2,(H,12,13);/q;;+2/p-2/t2*2-,3-,4+,5-;/m11./s1 Key: VRIVJOXICYMTAG-IYEMJOQQSA-L; InChI=1/2C6H12O7.Fe/c2*7-1-2(8)3(9)4(10)5(11)6(12)13;/h2*2-5,7-11H,1H2,(H,12,13);/q;;+2/p-2/t2*2-,3-,4+,5-;/m11./s1 Key: VRIVJOXICYMTAG-QFKJHGNTBV
- SMILES: [Fe+2].O[C@H]([C@@H](O)C([O-])=O)[C@H](O)[C@H](O)CO.[O-]C(=O)[C@H](O)[C@@H](O)[C@H](O)[C@H](O)CO

Properties
| Chemical formula | FeC_{12}H_{22}O_{14} |
| Molar mass | 446.14 g/mol |
| Appearance | light yellow to brown powder |
| Odor | slight caramel odor |
| Melting point | 188 °C (370 °F; 461 K) dihydrate (decomposes) |
| Solubility in water | soluble |
| Solubility | soluble in glycerin negligible in alcohol |

Pharmacology
| ATC code | B03AA03 (WHO); B03AD05 (WHO) (combination with folic acid) |

Hazards
- GHS labelling
| Pictograms | (GHS07: Exclamation mark) |
| Signal word | Warning |
| Hazard statements | H302 |
| Precautionary statements | P264, P270, P301+P317, P330, P501 |
- Except where otherwise noted, data are given for materials in their standard state (at 25 °C [77 °F], 100 kPa). verify (what is ?) Infobox references

Iron(II) gluconate, or ferrous gluconate, is a black compound often used as an iron supplement. It is the iron(II) salt of gluconic acid with the chemical formula Fe(C_{6}H_{11}O_{7})_{2}⋅nH_{2}O (n=0,2). It is marketed under brand names such as Fergon, Ferralet and Simron.

== Structure ==
The anhydrous compound, dried under vacuum at 77 °C (350 K; 171 °F) forms a triclinic structure (space group P1). Samples dried in air at temperatures above 100 °C (373 K; 212 °F) exhibit a monoclinic structure (s.g. P121). The dihydrate also exhibits a monoclinic unit cell (s.g. I2), while partially hydrated samples can be described as a superposition of two phases, P1 and I2.

== Preparation ==
Ferrous gluconate dihydrate can be precipitated by mixing solutions of ferrous sulfate and barium gluconate.

== Uses ==
=== Medical ===
Ferrous gluconate is used in the treatment of hypochromic anemia. The use of this compound compared with other iron preparations results in satisfactory reticulocyte responses, a high percentage utilization of iron, and an increase in hemoglobin to normal levels in a reasonably short time.

=== Food additive ===
Ferrous gluconate is also used as a food additive when processing black olives. It is represented by the food labeling E number E579 in Europe. It imparts a uniform jet black color to the olives.

== Reactions ==
Upon heating, the compound decomposes to either α-Fe_{2}O_{3} or γ-Fe_{2}O_{3} depending on the atmosphere under which the process occurs.

== Toxicity ==
Ferrous gluconate may be toxic in case of overdose. Children may show signs of toxicity with ingestions of 10–20 mg/kg of elemental iron. Serious toxicity may result from ingestions of more than 60 mg/kg. Iron exerts both local and systemic effects: it is corrosive to the gastrointestinal mucosa, it can have a negative impact on the heart and blood (dehydration, low blood pressure, fast and weak pulse, shock), lungs, liver, gastrointestinal system (diarrhea, nausea, vomiting blood), nervous system (chills, dizziness, coma, convulsions, headache), and skin (flushing, loss of color, bluish-colored lips and fingernails). The symptoms may disappear in a few hours, but then emerge again after 1 or more days.

== See also ==
- Acceptable daily intake
- Iron poisoning
