= Peficitinib =

Chemical compound

Clinical data
- Trade names: Smyraf
- Other names: ASP015K; JNJ-54781532
- ATC code: L04AF06 (WHO)

Legal status
- Legal status: In general: ℞ (Prescription only)

Identifiers
- IUPAC name: 4-[((1S,3R)-5-hydroxy-2-adamantyl)amino]-1H-pyrrolo[2,3-b]pyridine-5-carboxamide
- CAS Number: 944118-01-8
- PubChem CID: 57928403
- UNII: HPH1166CKX
- KEGG: D10721

Chemical and physical data
- Formula: C_{18}H_{22}N_{4}O_{2}
- Molar mass: 326.400 g·mol^{−1}
- 3D model (JSmol): Interactive image
- SMILES: NC(=O)c1cnc2[nH]ccc2c1NC1[C@H]2CC3C[C@@H]1CC(O)(C3)C2
- InChI: InChI=1S/C18H22N4O2/c19-16(23)13-8-21-17-12(1-2-20-17)15(13)22-14-10-3-9-4-11(14)7-18(24,5-9)6-10/h1-2,8-11,14,24H,3-7H2,(H2,19,23)(H2,20,21,22)/t9?,10-,11+,1; Key:DREIJXJRTLTGJC-JQCLMNFQSA-N

Peficitinib (brand name Smyraf) is a pharmaceutical drug used for the treatment of rheumatoid arthritis. It belongs to the class of drugs known as Janus kinase inhibitors (JAK inhibitors).

Peficitinib was approved for use in Japan in 2019.
