= EGLN1 =

Protein-coding gene in humans

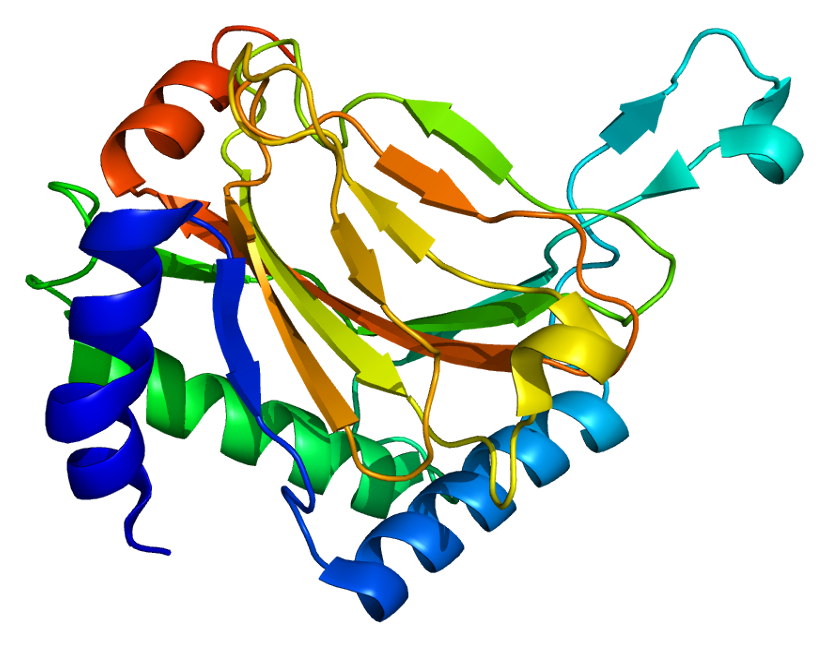

Identifiers
- Aliases: EGLN1, C1orf12, ECYT3, HIF-PH2, HIFPH2, HPH-2, HPH2, PHD2, SM20, ZMYND6, HALAH, egl-9 family hypoxia inducible factor 1
- External IDs: OMIM: 606425; MGI: 1932286; GeneCards: EGLN1
Available structures
PDB	Ortholog search: PDBe RCSB
PDB	List of PDB id codes 2G19, 2G1M, 2HBT, 2HBU, 2Y33, 2Y34, 3HQR, 3HQU, 3OUH, 3OUI, 3OUJ, 4BQW, 4BQX, 4BQY, 4JZR, 4KBZ, 4UWD, 5A3U
Enzyme activity
EC #	BRENDA	ExPASy	KEGG	MetaCyc
1.14.11.29	↗	↗	↗	↗

Gene location (Human)
Chr.	Chromosome 1 (human)
Band	1q42.2	Start	231,363,751 bp
Band	1q42.2	End	231,422,287 bp

Gene location (Mouse)
Chr.	Chromosome 8 (mouse)
Band	8|8 E2	Start	125,635,326 bp
Band	8|8 E2	End	125,676,063 bp
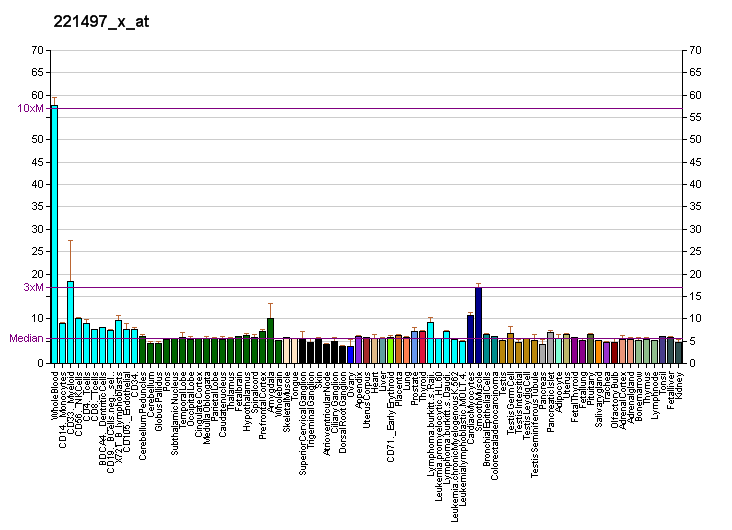
RNA expression pattern
Bgee	Human / Mouse (ortholog); Top expressed in: gastrocnemius muscle; Achilles tendon; muscle of thigh; ventricular zone; islet of Langerhans; body of pancreas; ganglionic eminence; right auricle of heart; smooth muscle tissue; left ventricle / Top expressed in: myocardium of ventricle; digastric muscle; cardiac muscle tissue of left ventricle; interventricular septum; right ventricle; extraocular muscle; plantaris muscle; vastus lateralis muscle; triceps brachii muscle; extensor digitorum longus muscle; More reference expression data
BioGPS	More reference expression data
Gene ontology
Molecular function	2-oxoglutarate-dependent dioxygenase activity; iron ion binding; L-ascorbic acid binding; dioxygenase activity; metal ion binding; protein binding; oxidoreductase activity, acting on paired donors, with incorporation or reduction of molecular oxygen; peptidyl-proline dioxygenase activity; enzyme binding; oxidoreductase activity; peptidyl-proline 4-dioxygenase activity; ferrous iron binding
Cellular component	cytoplasm; nucleus; cytosol; postsynaptic density; glutamatergic synapse
Biological process	response to hypoxia; heart trabecula formation; ventricular septum morphogenesis; labyrinthine layer development; response to nitric oxide; peptidyl-proline hydroxylation to 4-hydroxy-L-proline; cardiac muscle tissue morphogenesis; regulation of angiogenesis; negative regulation of DNA-binding transcription factor activity; regulation of transcription from RNA polymerase II promoter in response to hypoxia; negative regulation of cyclic-nucleotide phosphodiesterase activity; oxygen homeostasis; regulation of neuron death; cellular iron ion homeostasis; positive regulation of transcription by RNA polymerase II; regulation of postsynapse organization; regulation of protein catabolic process at postsynapse, modulating synaptic transmission
Sources:Amigo / QuickGO
Orthologs
Databases	NCBI: entry; OMA: entry
Species	Human	Mouse
Entrez	54583	112405
Ensembl	ENSG00000135766	ENSMUSG00000031987
UniProt	Q9GZT9	Q91YE3
RefSeq (mRNA)	NM_022051; NM_001377260; NM_001377261	NM_053207; NM_001363475
RefSeq (protein)	NP_071334	NP_444437; NP_001350404
Location (UCSC)	Chr 1: 231.36 – 231.42 Mb	Chr 8: 125.64 – 125.68 Mb
PubMed search
- Wikidata
View/Edit Human	View/Edit Mouse

Hypoxia-inducible factor prolyl hydroxylase 2 (HIF-PH2), or prolyl hydroxylase domain-containing protein 2 (PHD2), is an enzyme encoded by the EGLN1 gene. It is also known as Egl nine homolog 1. PHD2 is a α-ketoglutarate/2-oxoglutarate-dependent hydroxylase, a superfamily non-haem iron-containing proteins. In humans, PHD2 is one of the three isoforms of hypoxia-inducible factor-proline dioxygenase, which is also known as HIF prolyl-hydroxylase.

== The hypoxia response ==
HIF-1α is a ubiquitous, constitutively synthesized transcription factor responsible for upregulating the expression of genes involved in the cellular response to hypoxia. These gene products may include proteins such as glycolytic enzymes and angiogenic growth factors. In normoxia, HIF alpha subunits are marked for the ubiquitin-proteasome degradation pathway through hydroxylation of proline-564 and proline-402 by PHD2. Prolyl hydroxylation is critical for promoting pVHL binding to HIF, which targets HIF for polyubiquitylation.

== Structure ==
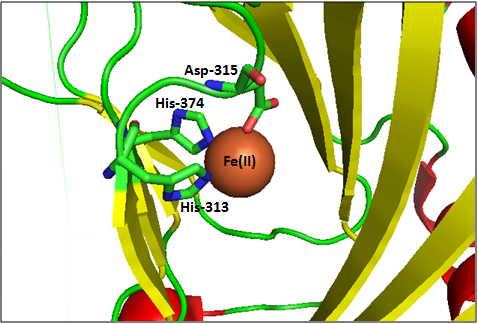
The iron binding site of PHD2

PHD2 is a 46-kDa enzyme that consists of an N-terminal domain homologous to MYND zinc finger domains, and a C-terminal domain homologous to the 2-oxoglutarate dioxygenases. The catalytic domain consists of a double-stranded β-helix core that is stabilized by three α-helices packed along the major β-sheet. The active site, which is contained in the pocket between the β-sheets, chelates iron(II) through histidine and aspartate coordination. 2-oxoglutarate displaces a water molecule to bind iron as well. The active site is lined by hydrophobic residues, possibly because such residues are less susceptible to potential oxidative damage by reactive species leaking from the iron center.

PHD2 catalyses the hydroxylation of two sites on HIF-α, which are termed the N-terminal oxygen dependent degradation domain (residues 395-413, NODD) and the C-terminal oxygen dependent degradation domain (residues 556-574, CODD). These two HIF substrates are usually represented by 19 amino acid long peptides in in vitro experiments. X-ray crystallography and NMR spectroscopy showed that both peptides bind to the same binding site on PHD2, in a cleft on the PHD2 surface. An induced fit mechanism was indicated from the structure, in which residues 237-254 adopt a closed loop conformation, whilst in the structure without CODD or NODD, the same residues adopted an open finger-like conformation. Such conformational change was confirmed by NMR spectroscopy, X-ray crystallography and molecular dynamics calculations. A recent study found a second peptide binding site on PHD2 although peptide binding to this alternative site did not seem to affect the catalytic activity of the enzyme. Further studies are required to fully understand the biological significance of this second peptide binding site.

The enzyme has a high affinity for iron(II) and 2-oxoglutarate (also known as α-ketoglutarate), and forms a long-lived complex with these factors. It has been proposed that cosubstrate and iron concentrations poise the HIF hydroxylases to respond to an appropriate "hypoxic window" for a particular cell type or tissue. Studies have revealed that PHD2 has a K_{M} for dioxygen slightly above its atmospheric concentration, and PHD2 is thought to be the most important sensor of the cell's oxygen status.

== Mechanism ==
The enzyme incorporates one oxygen atom from dioxygen into the hydroxylated product, and one oxygen atom into the succinate coproduct. Its interactions with HIF-1α rely on a mobile loop region that helps to enclose the hydroxylation site and helps to stabilize binding of both iron and 2-oxyglutarate. A feedback regulation mechanism that involves the displacement of HIF-1α by hydroxylated HIF-1α when 2-oxoglutarate is limiting was also proposed.

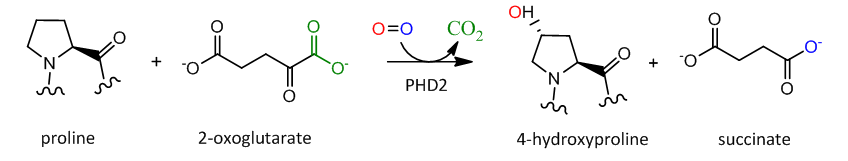
PHD2 acts as a dioxygenase to hydroxylate proline and convert 2-oxoglutarate to succinate.

== Biological role and disease relevance ==
PHD2 is the primary regulator of HIF-1α steady state levels in the cell. A PHD2 knockdown showed increased levels of HIF-1α under normoxia, and an increase in HIF-1α nuclear accumulation and HIF-dependent transcription. HIF-1α steady state accumulation was dependent on the amount of PHD silencing effected by siRNA in HeLa cells and a variety of other human cell lines.

However, although it would seem that PHD2 downregulates HIF-1α and thus also tumorigenesis, there have been suggestions of paradoxical roles of PHD2 in tumor proliferation. For example, one animal study showed tumor reduction in PHD2-deficient mice through activation of antiproliferative TGF-β signaling. Other in vivo models showed tumor-suppressing activity for PHD2 in pancreatic cancer as well as liver cancer. A study of 121 human patients revealed PHD2 as a strong prognostic marker in gastric cancer, with PHD2-negative patients having shortened survival compared to PHD2-positive patients.

Recent genome-wide association studies have suggested that EGLN1 may be involved in the low hematocrit phenotype exhibited by the Tibetan population and hence that EGLN1 may play a role in the heritable adaptation of this population to live at high altitude.

== As a therapeutic target ==
HIF's important role as a homeostatic mediator implicates PHD2 as a therapeutic target for a range of disorders regarding angiogenesis, erythropoeisis, and cellular proliferation. There has been interest both in potentiating and inhibiting the activity of PHD2. For example, methylselenocysteine (MSC) inhibition of HIF-1α led to tumor growth inhibition in renal cell carcinoma in a PHD-dependent manner. It is thought that this phenomenon relies on PHD-stabilization, but mechanistic details of this process have not yet been investigated. On the other hand, screens of small-molecule chelators have revealed hydroxypyrones and hydroxypyridones as potential inhibitors for PHD2. Recently, dihydropyrazoles, a triazole-based small molecule, was found to be a potent inhibitor of PHD2 that is active both in vitro and in vivo. Substrate analog peptides have also been developed to exhibit inhibitory selectivity for PHD2 over factor inhibiting HIF (FIH), for which some other PHD-inhibitors show overlapping specificity. Gasotransmitters including carbon monoxide and nitric oxide are also inhibitors of PHD2 by competing with molecular oxygen for binding at the active site Fe(II) ion.

Additionally, PHD2 holds significant promise as a therapeutic target for ischemic conditions. Ischemia, characterized by reduced blood flow and oxygen supply, can lead to severe tissue damage and dysfunction. Modulating PHD2 activity in ischemic conditions can enhance tissue survival and recovery by stabilizing HIF-1α, which in turn activates genes that facilitate adaptive responses to hypoxia. This includes promoting angiogenesis, erythropoiesis, and metabolic reprogramming, crucial for cell survival under oxygen-deprived conditions. Preclinical studies have suggested that inhibition of PHD2 can reduce tissue damage in models of myocardial infarction and cerebral ischemia, providing a foundation for future therapeutic strategies aimed at minimizing the consequences of acute ischemic events. Ongoing research continues to explore the efficacy and safety of PHD2 inhibitors in various ischemic scenarios, with the potential to extend these findings to clinical applications.
