= Roxadustat =

Anti-anemia medication

Clinical data
- Trade names: Evrenzo
- Other names: FG-4592, ASP1517, AZD9941
- Routes of administration: By mouth
- ATC code: B03XA05 (WHO)

Legal status
- Legal status: EU: Rx-only; In general: ℞ (Prescription only)

Identifiers
- IUPAC name: 2-[(4-Hydroxy-1-methyl-7-phenoxyisoquinoline-3-carbonyl)amino]acetic acid
- CAS Number: 808118-40-3
- PubChem CID: 11256664
- DrugBank: DB04847
- ChemSpider: 9431690
- UNII: X3O30D9YMX
- KEGG: D10593
- CompTox Dashboard (EPA): DTXSID60230644
- ECHA InfoCard: 100.245.356

Chemical and physical data
- Formula: C_{19}H_{16}N_{2}O_{5}
- Molar mass: 352.346 g·mol^{−1}
- 3D model (JSmol): Interactive image
- SMILES: CC1=NC(=C(C2=C1C=C(C=C2)OC3=CC=CC=C3)O)C(=O)NCC(=O)O
- InChI: InChI=1S/C19H16N2O5/c1-11-15-9-13(26-12-5-3-2-4-6-12)7-8-14(15)18(24)17(21-11)19(25)20-10-16(22)23/h2-9,24H,10H2,1H3,(H,20,25)(H,22,23); Key:YOZBGTLTNGAVFU-UHFFFAOYSA-N

Roxadustat, sold under the brand name Evrenzo, is an anti-anemia medication. Roxadustat is a HIF prolyl-hydroxylase inhibitor that increases endogenous production of erythropoietin and stimulates production of hemoglobin and red blood cells. It was investigated in clinical trials for the treatment of anemia caused by chronic kidney disease. It is taken by mouth. The drug was developed by FibroGen, in partnership with Astellas and AstraZeneca.

The most common side effects include hypertension (high blood pressure), vascular access thrombosis (formation of blood clots in the blood vessels associated with dialysis), diarrhea, peripheral edema (swelling especially of the ankles and feet), hyperkalemia (high blood potassium levels) and nausea (feeling sick).

Roxadustat received its first global approval in China in December 2018, for the treatment of anemia caused by chronic kidney disease in people who are dialysis-dependent. It was approved in Japan in 2019, for the treatment of anemia caused by chronic kidney disease in people on dialysis, and in 2020 for people not on dialysis. Roxadustat was approved for medical use in the European Union in August 2021.

== Medical uses ==
Roxadustat is indicated for treatment of adults with symptomatic anemia associated with chronic kidney disease.

== Adverse effects ==
Roxadustat is reported to increase VEGF, a signal protein that can activate tumor growth and also is considered to cause pulmonary hypertension. In phase 3 trial conducted at 29 sites in China, roxadustat treatment was found to cause hyperkalemia, i.e., increase in serum potassium, and metabolic acidosis in patients.

== Society and culture ==
=== Legal status ===
In July 2021, the Cardiovascular and Renal Drugs Advisory Committee of the US Food and Drug Administration (FDA) voted against the use of roxadustat in people with anemia in chronic kidney disease, both for those that are non-dialysis-dependent and those that are on dialysis. Significant safety concerns were raised that the panelists believed could not be addressed without further study. Notably, prior to the vote of the FDA committee, FibroGen and AstraZeneca announced that the company had changed parameters used to analyze cardiovascular safety data, which made the drug appear safer than it is.

=== Usage as a doping product ===
Due to the potential applications of roxadustat in athletic doping, such as raising haemoglobin levels and stimulating the production of red blood cells, it has been incorporated into screens for performance-enhancing drugs, as it has already been detected being used illicitly by athletes. In March 2024, following a lengthy process, former world No. 1 tennis player Simona Halep received a nine month ban for unintentional use of roxadustat that was sourced to a contaminated supplement that she had ingested.

== Synthesis ==
A 85-kilogram scale synthesis of roxadustat was recently reported.

A modified Ullman-type coupling converted 5-bromophthalide [64169-34-2] (1) into 5-phenoxyphthalide [57830-14-5] (2). The γ-lactone was opened to furnish an acid chloride intermediate which delivered methyl ester upon treatment with MeOH, methyl 2-(chloromethyl)-4-phenoxybenzoate [1455091-04-9] (3). Substitution of benzyl chloride with p-toluenesulfonylglycine methyl ester [2645-02-5] (4) was conducted under Finkelstein conditions to produce an intermediate [1455091-06-1] (5). This then underwent base-mediated cyclization and subsequent aromatization to produce isoquinoline, methyl 4-hydroxy-7-phenoxyisoquinoline-3-carboxylate [1455091-10-7] (6). Mannich reaction of the isoquinoline with bis(dimethylamino)methane [51-80-9] (7) in acetic acid furnished dimethylaminomethyl intermediate [1509958-19-3] (8). Treatment with acetic anhydride replaced the dimethylamino group with an acetoxy moiety to give methyl 1-(acetoxymethyl)-4-hydroxy-7-phenoxyisoquinoline-3-carboxylate [1509958-20-6] (10). The undesired bis-acetoxy adduct [1537180-08-7] (9) was treated with morpholine to generate additional 10. Catalytic hydrogenation of the acetoxy group yielded methyl 4-hydroxy-1-methyl-7-phenoxyisoquinoline-3-carboxylate [1421312-34-6] (11). Lastly, treatment with glycine (12) and sodium methoxide completed the synthesis of roxadustat (13).
