= Desidustat =

Chemical compound

Clinical data
- Other names: ZYAN1

Identifiers
- IUPAC name: 2-[[1-(Cyclopropylmethoxy)-4-hydroxy-2-oxoquinoline-3-carbonyl]amino]acetic acid
- CAS Number: 1616690-16-4
- PubChem CID: 75593290
- DrugBank: DB16135
- ChemSpider: 64835241
- UNII: Y962PQA4KS
- ChEBI: CHEBI:230352
- ChEMBL: ChEMBL4650314

Chemical and physical data
- Formula: C_{16}H_{16}N_{2}O_{6}
- Molar mass: 332.312 g·mol^{−1}
- 3D model (JSmol): Interactive image
- SMILES: C1CC1CON2C3=CC=CC=C3C(=C(C2=O)C(=O)NCC(=O)O)O
- InChI: InChI=1S/C16H16N2O6/c19-12(20)7-17-15(22)13-14(21)10-3-1-2-4-11(10)18(16(13)23)24-8-9-5-6-9/h1-4,9,21H,5-8H2,(H,17,22)(H,19,20); Key:IKRKQQLJYBAPQT-UHFFFAOYSA-N

Desidustat (INN, also known as ZYAN1) is a drug for the treatment of anemia of chronic kidney disease. This drug with the brand name Oxemia is discovered and developed by Zydus Life Sciences.

== Mechanism of action ==
Desidustat reduces the requirement of recombinant erythropoietin (EPO) in anemia, and decreases EPO-resistance, by reducing IL-6, IL-1β, and anti-EPO antibodies.

== Clinical Trials ==
Clinical trials on desidustat have been done in India and Australia.

== Potential additional indications ==
Desidustat has been studied for use in conditions beyond anemia of chronic kidney disease, including chemotherapy-induced anemia, inflammation-induced anemia, and acute kidney injury. It is also being evaluated in clinical trials for sickle cell disease and has been suggested as a treatment for complement-mediated diseases and stroke in chronic kidney disease patients.

== Society and culture ==
=== Regulatory approvals ===
The subject expert committee of CDSCO has recommended the grant of permission for manufacturing and marketing of Desidustat 25 mg and 50 mg tablets in India, based on some conditions related to package insert, phase 4 protocols, prescription details, and GCP.

=== Market and commercialization ===
Zydus Lifesciences and Sun Pharmaceuticals have entered an agreement in October 2023 to co-market Desidustat. Sun Pharma will sell the drug as Rytstat, while Zydus will continue to sell it as Oxemia.. On 13 March 2026, Desidustat Tablets has been approved for marketing in China by the National Medical Products Administration of the People’s Republic of China (NMPA).
