= EGLN2 =

Protein-coding gene in the species Homo sapiens

Identifiers
- Aliases: EGLN2, EIT6, HIF-PH1, HIFPH1, HPH-1, HPH-3, PHD1, egl-9 family hypoxia inducible factor 2, EIT-6
- External IDs: OMIM: 606424; MGI: 1932287; GeneCards: EGLN2
Enzyme activity
EC #	BRENDA	ExPASy	KEGG	MetaCyc
1.14.11.29	↗	↗	↗	↗

Gene location (Human)
Chr.	Chromosome 19 (human)
Band	19q13.2	Start	40,798,996 bp
Band	19q13.2	End	40,808,434 bp

Gene location (Mouse)
Chr.	Chromosome 7 (mouse)
Band	7 A3|7 15.83 cM	Start	26,858,083 bp
Band	7 A3|7 15.83 cM	End	26,866,227 bp
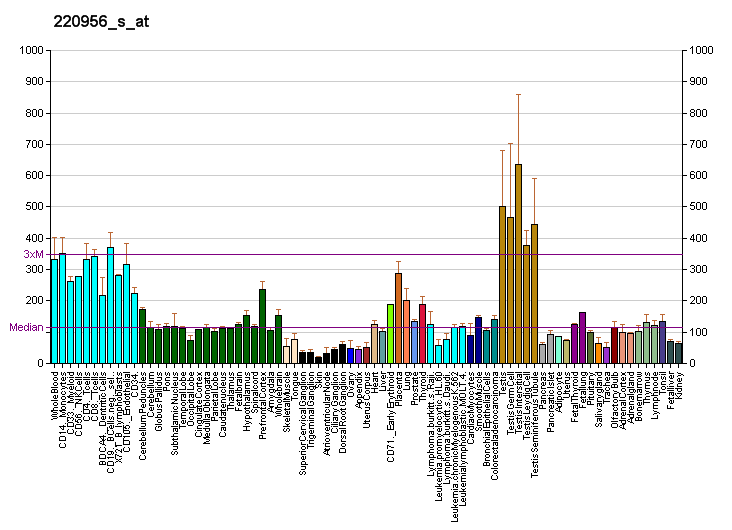
RNA expression pattern
Bgee	Human / Mouse (ortholog); Top expressed in: left testis; right testis; blood; spleen; right lung; apex of heart; upper lobe of left lung; mucosa of transverse colon; primary visual cortex; putamen / Top expressed in: seminiferous tubule; entorhinal cortex; Ileal epithelium; perirhinal cortex; choroid plexus of fourth ventricle; CA3 field; spermatid; muscle of thigh; Paneth cell; crypt of lieberkuhn of small intestine; More reference expression data
BioGPS	More reference expression data
Gene ontology
Molecular function	2-oxoglutarate-dependent dioxygenase activity; L-ascorbic acid binding; iron ion binding; dioxygenase activity; metal ion binding; protein binding; oxidoreductase activity, acting on paired donors, with incorporation or reduction of molecular oxygen; oxidoreductase activity; ferrous iron binding; oxygen gasoreceptor activity; peptidyl-proline 4-dioxygenase activity
Cellular component	nucleoplasm; nucleus
Biological process	response to hypoxia; positive regulation of protein catabolic process; regulation of neuron apoptotic process; peptidyl-proline hydroxylation to 4-hydroxy-L-proline; cell redox homeostasis; regulation of cell growth; regulation of transcription from RNA polymerase II promoter in response to hypoxia; intracellular estrogen receptor signaling pathway
Sources:Amigo / QuickGO
Orthologs
Databases	NCBI: entry; OMA: entry
Species	Human	Mouse
Entrez	112398	112406
Ensembl	ENSG00000269858	ENSMUSG00000058709
UniProt	Q96KS0	Q91YE2
RefSeq (mRNA)	NM_080732; NM_017555; NM_053046	NM_053208; NM_001357767
RefSeq (protein)	NP_444274; NP_542770	NP_444438; NP_001344696
Location (UCSC)	Chr 19: 40.8 – 40.81 Mb	Chr 7: 26.86 – 26.87 Mb
PubMed search
- Wikidata
View/Edit Human	View/Edit Mouse

Egl nine homolog 2 is a protein that in humans is encoded by the EGLN2 gene. ELGN2 is an alpha-ketoglutarate-dependent hydroxylase, a superfamily of non-haem iron-containing proteins.

The hypoxia inducible factor (HIF) is a transcriptional complex which is involved in oxygen homeostasis. At normal oxygen levels, the alpha subunit of HIF is targeted for degradation by prolyl hydroxylation. This gene encodes an enzyme responsible for this posttranslational modification. Multiple alternatively spliced variants, encoding the same protein, have been identified.
