= Vadadustat =

Chemical compound

Clinical data
- Trade names: Vafseo
- Other names: AKB-6548, PG-1016548
- AHFS/Drugs.com: Monograph
- License data: US DailyMed: Vadadustat
- Pregnancy category: AU: C
- ATC code: B03XA08 (WHO)

Legal status
- Legal status: AU: S4 (Prescription only); US: ℞-only; EU: Rx-only

Identifiers
- IUPAC name: 2-([5-(3-Chlorophenyl)-3-hydroxypyridine-2-carbonyl]amino)acetic acid
- CAS Number: 1000025-07-9
- PubChem CID: 23634441
- DrugBank: DB12255
- ChemSpider: 34958379
- UNII: I60W9520VV
- KEGG: D11078
- ChEMBL: ChEMBL3646221
- PDB ligand: A1Z (PDBe, RCSB PDB)
- CompTox Dashboard (EPA): DTXSID501179936
- ECHA InfoCard: 100.248.991

Chemical and physical data
- Formula: C_{14}H_{11}ClN_{2}O_{4}
- Molar mass: 306.70 g·mol^{−1}
- 3D model (JSmol): Interactive image
- SMILES: Oc1cc(cnc1C(=O)NCC(=O)O)c2cccc(Cl)c2
- InChI: InChI=1S/C14H11ClN2O4/c15-10-3-1-2-8(4-10)9-5-11(18)13(16-6-9)14(21)17-7-12(19)20/h1-6,18H,7H2,(H,17,21)(H,19,20); Key:JGRXMPYUTJLTKT-UHFFFAOYSA-N

Vadadustat, sold under the brand name Vafseo, is a medication used for the treatment of symptomatic anemia associated with chronic kidney disease. Vadadustat is a hypoxia-inducible factor prolyl hydroxylase inhibitor.

The most common side effects include thromboembolic events (problems due to the formation of blood clots in the blood vessels), diarrhea, and hypertension (high blood pressure).

Vadadustat was approved for medical use in the European Union in April 2023, and in the United States in March 2024.

== Medical uses ==
In the EU, vadadustat is indicated for the treatment of symptomatic anemia associated with chronic kidney disease in adults on chronic maintenance dialysis.

In the US, vadadustat is indicated for the treatment of anemia due to chronic kidney disease in adults who have been receiving dialysis for at least three months.

== History ==
The US Food and Drug Administration approved vadadustat based on evidence from two clinical trials, INNO2VATE-1 (NCT02865850) and INNO2VATE-2 (NCT02892149), in which 3,923 adults with anemia due to CKD who have been receiving dialysis for at least three months were equally randomized to receive either vadadustat or darbepoetin alfa. The trials were conducted at 83 sites in one study and 275 sites in another study in a total of 18 countries in North America, South America, Europe, Africa, and Asia, of which 2,361 (60%) participants were from the United States. The same trials were used to evaluate the safety and efficacy of vadadustat. INNO2VATE-1 and INNO2VATE-2 were both global, multi-center, randomized, active-controlled, non-inferiority, open-label trials. Participants in each trial were randomized equally to receive either vadadustat with a starting dose of 300 mg once daily or darbepoetin alfa administered subcutaneously or intravenously as per the prescribing information for 52 weeks to assess the efficacy endpoints. Vadadustat was administered in increments of 150 mg up to 600 mg to achieve the hemoglobin (Hb) target. After 52 weeks, participants continued study medication to assess long-term safety until a major adverse cardiovascular event (MACE) occurred. Efficacy in each study was based on the difference in mean change of Hb from baseline to Weeks 24 to 36 of the trial. An additional efficacy endpoint was the difference in the average change of Hb from baseline to Weeks 40 to 52. Results showed that vadadustat was non-inferior to darbepoetin alfa in terms of preserving cardiovascular safety and correcting and maintaining of hemoglobin concentrations.

== Society and culture ==
=== Legal status ===
In February 2023, the Committee for Medicinal Products for Human Use of the European Medicines Agency adopted a positive opinion, recommending the granting of a marketing authorization for the medicinal product Vafseo, intended for the treatment of symptomatic anemia in adults with chronic kidney disease who are on chronic dialysis. The applicant for this medicinal product is Akebia Europe Limited. Vadadustat was approved for medical use in the European Union in April 2023.

== Research ==
Vadadustat is in phase III clinical trials for the treatment of anemia caused by chronic kidney disease.
