= Anemia of chronic disease =

- Other names: Anemia of chronic inflammation Anemia of inflammation Anemia of inflammatory response

Anemia of chronic disease (ACD) or anemia of chronic inflammation is a form of anemia seen in chronic infection, chronic immune activation, and malignancy. These conditions all produce elevation of interleukin-6, which stimulates hepcidin production and release from the liver. Hepcidin production and release shuts down ferroportin, a protein that controls export of iron from the gut and from iron storing cells (e.g. macrophages). As a consequence, circulating iron levels are reduced. Other mechanisms may also play a role, such as reduced erythropoiesis. It is also known as anemia of inflammation, or anemia of inflammatory response.

== Classification ==
Anemia of chronic disease is usually mild but can be severe. It is usually normocytic, but can be microcytic. The presence of both anemia of chronic disease and dietary iron deficiency results in a more severe anemia.

== Pathophysiology ==
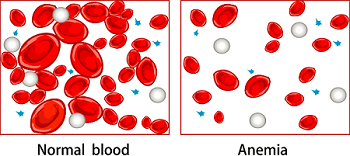
Slide comparison in Red Blood Cell Count between normal blood and anemic blood.

Anemia is defined by hemoglobin (Hb) concentration

- < 13.0 g/dL (130 g/L) in males
- < 11.5 g/dL (115 g/L) in females

In response to inflammatory cytokines, increasingly IL-6, the liver produces increased amounts of hepcidin. Hepcidin in turn causes increased internalisation of ferroportin molecules on cell membranes which prevents release from iron stores. Inflammatory cytokines also appear to affect other important elements of iron metabolism, including decreasing ferroportin expression, and probably directly blunting erythropoiesis by decreasing the ability of the bone marrow to respond to erythropoietin.

Before the recent discovery of hepcidin and its function in iron metabolism, anemia of chronic disease was seen as the result of a complex web of inflammatory changes. Over the last few years, however, many investigators have come to feel that hepcidin is the central actor in producing anemia of chronic inflammation. Hepcidin provides a unifying explanation for the condition, and more recent descriptions of human iron metabolism and hepcidin function reflect this view.

In addition to effects of iron sequestration, inflammatory cytokines promote the production of white blood cells. Bone marrow produces both white blood cells and red blood cells from the same precursor stem cells. Therefore, the upregulation of white blood cells causes fewer stem cells to differentiate into red blood cells. This effect may be an important additional cause for the decreased erythropoiesis and red blood cell production seen in anemia of inflammation, even when erythropoietin levels are normal, and even aside from the effects of hepcidin. Nonetheless, there are other mechanisms that also contribute to the lowering of hemoglobin levels during inflammation: (i) Inflammatory cytokines suppress the proliferation of erythroid precursors in the bone marrow.; (ii) inflammatory cytokines inhibit the release of erythropoietin (EPO) from the kidney; and (iii) the survival time of circulating red cells is shortened.

Inflammatory cytokines beyond IL-6 — notably tumor necrosis factor-α (TNF-α) and interleukin-1 (IL-1) — further impair erythropoiesis by reducing erythroid progenitor proliferation, promoting apoptosis of erythroid precursors, and blunting renal erythropoietin production. Inflammation may also shorten erythrocyte lifespan via oxidative damage and enhanced phagocytic clearance. These effects act together with hepcidin-driven iron sequestration to produce the characteristic normocytic (or sometimes microcytic) anemia of chronic disease.

In the short term, the overall effect of these changes is likely positive: it allows the body to keep more iron away from bacterial pathogens in the body, while producing more immune cells to fight off infection. Almost all bacteria depend on iron to live and multiply. However, if inflammation continues, the effect of locking up iron stores is to reduce the ability of the bone marrow to produce red blood cells. These cells require iron for their massive amounts of hemoglobin which allow them to transport oxygen.

Because anemia of chronic disease can be the result of non-infective causes of inflammation, future research is likely to investigate whether hepcidin antagonists might be able to treat this problem.

Anemia of chronic disease may also be due to neoplastic disorders and non-infectious inflammatory diseases. Neoplastic disorders include Hodgkin disease and lung and breast carcinoma, while non-infectious inflammatory diseases include celiac disease, rheumatoid arthritis, systemic lupus erythematosus, scleroderma and dermatomyositis.

Anemia of chronic disease, as it is now understood, is to at least some degree separate from the anemia seen in kidney failure in which anemia results from reduced production of erythropoietin, or the anemia caused by some drugs (like AZT, used to treat HIV infection) that have the side effect of inhibiting erythropoiesis. In other words, not all anemia seen in people with chronic disease should be diagnosed as anemia of chronic disease. On the other hand, both of these examples show the complexity of this diagnosis: HIV infection itself can produce anemia of chronic disease, and kidney failure can lead to inflammatory changes that also can produce anemia of chronic disease.

== Diagnosis ==
While no single test is reliable to distinguish iron deficiency anemia from the anemia of chronic inflammation, there are sometimes some suggestive data:

- In anemia of chronic inflammation without iron deficiency, ferritin is normal or high, reflecting the fact that iron is sequestered within cells, and ferritin is being produced as an acute phase reactant. In iron deficiency anemia (IDA) ferritin is low.
- Some laboratories and guidelines use numeric thresholds to help distinguish iron sequestration from iron deficiency: serum ferritin values >100 ng/mL tend to support an inflammatory iron-sequestration pattern, while transferrin saturation is commonly 10–20% and total iron-binding capacity (TIBC) is normal or low in anemia of chronic disease. Ferritin values <30–50 ng/mL more strongly suggest coexisting iron deficiency and should prompt evaluation for iron deficiency as a contributing cause.
- TIBC is high in iron deficiency, reflecting production of more transferrin to increase iron binding; TIBC is low or normal in anemia of chronic inflammation.

Many patients with anemia of chronic disease will also have signs of iron deficiency on labs. Despite the deficit of iron in the body, the underlying cause of anemia in these patients is the inflammation, not the loss of iron. This nuance leads to frequent misdiagnosis as iron deficiency anemia, a disease in which the lack of iron is the root cause of anemia.

== Treatment ==
The ideal treatment for anemia of chronic disease is to treat the chronic disease successfully, but this is rarely possible.

Parenteral iron is increasingly used for anemia in chronic renal disease and inflammatory bowel disease (IBD). There is low-certainty evidence that people receiving treatment for IBD-related anemia with Intravenous (IV) iron infusion may be 17% more likely to benefit than those given oral iron therapy, and could be 61% less likely to stop treatment early due to adverse effects. However, the type of IV iron preparation may influence the degree of both benefit and harm: Moderate-certainty evidence suggests that IV ferric carboxymaltose treatment may be 25% more likely to improve anemia than IV iron sucrose preparation. The risk of serious side effects such as bleeding, electrolyte depletion and cardiac arrest could be greater with ferric carboxymaltose therapy, however the certainty of this evidence is low.

Erythropoietin treatment, which stimulates the production of red blood cell production, is sometimes used to treat severe or persistent anemia, both as a monotherapy and a combination therapy alongside IV iron, but is costly and the benefit is unclear. Very low-certainty evidence suggests that erythropoietin as a monotherapy may improve anemia more than a placebo. Any additional benefit of treating someone with erythropoietin in combination with IV iron sucrose treatment is not clear.

Erythropoiesis-stimulating agents (ESAs) are clearly indicated in particular clinical settings such as chronic kidney disease and some chemotherapy-related anemias, where they can raise hemoglobin and reduce transfusion needs. However, trials of ESA use in other chronic inflammatory conditions have shown mixed efficacy and an increased risk of thromboembolic events and mortality when higher hemoglobin targets are pursued. For these reasons, guideline recommendations favor individualized assessment of risks versus benefits, conservative hemoglobin targets, and cautious dosing when ESAs are considered outside established indications.

Limiting some microbes' access to iron can reduce their virulence, thereby potentially reducing the severity of infection. Blood transfusion to patients with anemia of chronic disease is associated with a higher mortality, supporting the concept.

== See also ==
- List of circulatory system conditions
- List of hematologic conditions
