= Latent iron deficiency =

Latent Iron Deficiency
- Other names: Iron-deficient erythropoiesis
- Specialty: Endocrinology

Latent iron deficiency (LID), also called iron-deficient erythropoiesis, is a medical condition in which there is evidence of iron deficiency without anemia (normal hemoglobin level). It is important to assess this condition because individuals with latent iron deficiency may develop iron-deficiency anemia. Additionally, there is some evidence of a decrease in vitality and an increase in fatigue among individuals with LID.

== Diagnosis ==
=== Diagnostic tests for latent iron deficiency (LID) ===
- complete blood count
- hemoglobin
- serum iron
- total iron binding capacity
- serum ferritin
- bone marrow examination (rarely)

Note: Iron therapy must be suspended 48 hours beforehand to ensure valid test results.

The normal range for hemoglobin is 13.8 to 17.2 grams per deciliter (g/dL) for men and 12.1 to 15.1 g/dL for women. Low hemoglobin indicates anemia but the individual will be normal for LID.

Normal serum iron is between 60 and 170 micrograms per dL (μg/dL). Normal total iron-binding capacity for both sexes is 240 to 450 μg/dL. Total iron-binding capacity increases when iron deficiency exists.

Serum ferritin levels reflect the body's available iron stores. The normal range is 20 to 200 nanograms per milliliter (ng/mL) for men and 50 to 150 ng/mL for women. Low levels (< 12 ng/mL) are specific for iron deficiency. However, inflammatory and neoplastic disorders can cause ferritin levels to increase – this may be seen in cases of hepatitis, leukemia, Hodgkin lymphoma, and gastrointestinal (GI) tract tumors.

The most sensitive and specific criterion for iron-deficient erythropoiesis is depleted iron stores in the bone marrow. However, in practice, a bone marrow examination is rarely needed.

=== Interpretation of diagnostic test results ===
LID is present in Stages 1 and 2, before anemia occurs in Stage 3. These first two stages can be interpreted as depletion of iron stores and reduction of effective iron transport.

Stage 1 – Characterized by loss of iron stores in the bone marrow while hemoglobin and serum iron levels remain normal. Serum ferritin falls to less than 20 ng/mL. Increased iron absorption, a compensatory change, results in an increased amount of transferrin and consequently increased iron-binding capacity.

Stage 2 – Erythropoiesis is impaired. Despite an increased level of transferrin, the serum iron level is decreased, along with the transferrin saturation. Erythropoiesis impairment begins when the serum iron level falls to less than 50 μg/dL and transferrin saturation is less than 16%.

Stage 3 – Anemia (reduced hemoglobin levels) is present, but red blood cell appearance remains normal.

Stage 4 – Changes in the appearance of red blood cells are the hallmark of this stage; first microcytosis and then hypochromia develop.

Stage 5 – Iron deficiency begins to affect tissues, manifesting as symptoms and signs.

== Treatment ==
There is no consensus on how to treat LID but one option is to treat it as iron-deficiency anemia by giving the individual ferrous sulfate (iron(II) sulfate) at a dose of 100 mg per day in two doses (one at breakfast and the other at dinner) or 3 mg per kilogram (kg) per day in children (also in two doses) for 2 or 3 months. The ideal is to increase the body's iron deposits, measured as levels of ferritin in serum, to reach a ferritin value between 30 and 100 ng/mL. A clinical study has shown an increase in ferritin levels in those taking iron compared with those taking a placebo. With ferritin levels higher than 100 ng/mL, an increase in infections has been reported. Another way to treat LID is with an iron-rich diet with ascorbic acid or vitamin C, contained in many types of fruits such as oranges, kiwifruits, etc., which will increase iron absorption 2- to 5-fold.

== Epidemiology ==
Many studies have evaluated LID; its frequency varies according to country of origin, diet, pregnancy status, age, gender, etc. Depending on these previous conditions, the frequency can vary from 11% in male athletes (Poland) to 44.7% in children less than 1 year old (China):

The frequency of LID in different countries and populations is as follows:

- Poland: 14 of 131 male athletes (11%); 31 of 121 female athletes (26%) with ID
- India: 27.5% amongst student nurses
- Spain: 31 of 211 women of child-bearing age (14.7%) in Barcelona
- China: In 3,591 pregnant and 3,721 premenopausal women from 15 provinces, LID was found in 1,529 (42.6%) pregnant women (urban first-trimester = 41.9%; rural = 36.1%) and in 1,280 (34.4%) premenopausal non-pregnant women (urban = 35.6%; rural = 32.4%). For pediatric samples: in 9,118 children from 31 provinces, aged 7 months to 7 years old, the incidence of LID was 32.5% (2,963 children). Sub-classifying the cases according to age and origin (global/countryside): less than 1 year old (7 to 12 months), LID was 44.7% (35.8% in countryside); 1 – 3 years old, LID was 35.9% (31% in countryside); 4 to 7 years old, LID was 26.5% (30.1% in countryside).
