= Intravenous iron infusion =

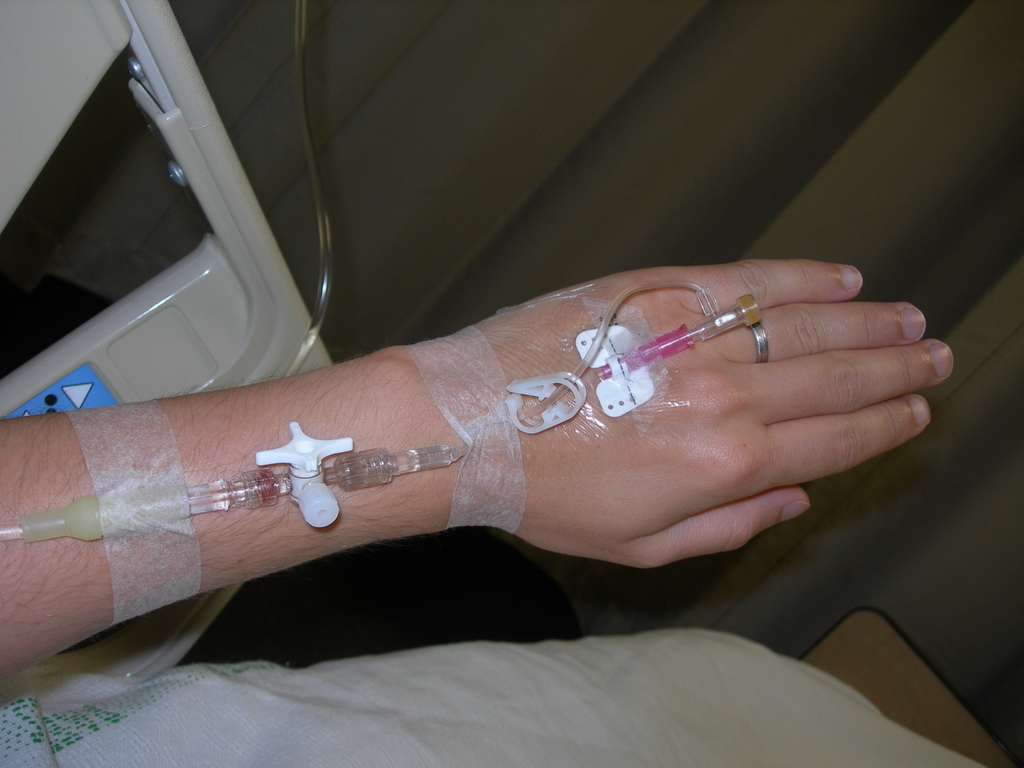
- Intravenous treatment administered on the back of the hand
- Specialty: Hematology

Intravenous iron infusion is a therapy in which a combination of iron and saline solution is delivered directly into the bloodstream through a vein, in patients suffering iron deficiency, iron-deficiency anaemia and chronic kidney disease. Intravenous (IV) iron infusions are recommended when oral iron supplementation fails to adequately restore iron and haemoglobin levels in the blood. The intravenous method is a fast, safe, and effective way to deliver iron throughout the body, as it can be administered instantly rather than gradually over time.

== Medical use ==
Iron deficiency is one of the most common nutritional deficiencies, affecting up to two billion people worldwide. Iron deficiency commonly occurs in patients suffering chronic infection. Intravenous iron infusions are used to treat patients with iron deficiency, iron-deficiency anaemia, and chronic kidney disease. IV iron infusions are administered to patients who cannot use or tolerate oral supplementation to treat their deficiency or if oral treatment has proven ineffective.

Oral iron supplements are the first line of care for iron deficiency and iron deficiency anaemia. Anaemic patients are treated with iron tablets containing 100 mg to 200 mg of iron. Oral iron tablets are not easily tolerated and may cause nausea, vomiting, abdominal pain, constipation and diarrhoea. The oxidative properties of iron conflict with the gastrointestinal tract prohibiting proper absorption of iron into the blood. Disorders affecting the gut lead to resistance against oral supplements. Side effects of constipation or diarrhoea are more common with the use of oral iron than intravenous iron. The adverse effects associated with oral iron supplements prohibit patients from completing the full course of medication.

Intravenous iron infusions are prescribed when gastrointestinal absorption is poor or when an urgent increase in haemoglobin levels is required for severely anaemic patients, such as women in their second and third trimesters of pregnancy. Iron deficiency anaemia affects 30-60% of pregnant women. Intravenous iron infusions are a form of treatment for pregnant women that ensures a fast and early recovery. Pregnant women are more likely to successfully replenish iron stores and increase their haemoglobin levels with intravenous iron compared to oral iron supplements. Recovery is reached faster and with fewer side effects than oral iron. Intravenous iron is proven to be very effective for pregnant women with iron deficiency anaemia, but not necessarily more effective than oral supplements for those with iron deficiency alone.

The type of iron supplement used depends on the patient's specific condition. The degree and severity of anaemia, tolerability to previous treatment, and history of allergy must all be considered before intravenous iron is administered. Correction of iron deficiency with oral iron supplements is particularly ineffective when a patient suffers from a coexisting medical condition. Intravenous iron therapy has an established role in the treatment of iron deficiency anaemia when oral supplements are ineffective or cannot be used. IV iron infusions can administer the exact dose of iron to normalise levels in the blood. Pre-operative anaemia is associated with a high risk of death. Intravenous iron infusions can optimise haemoglobin levels, significantly reducing mortality rates. IV iron is found to be highly effective for patients with chronic kidney disease when combined with erythropoiesis-stimulating agents. Recent studies of iron and its association with red blood cells have increased interest in the use and development of intravenous iron therapy to reduce the requirement for allogenic red blood cell transfusions. These findings show that intravenous iron has broad use in many patients where anaemia is an underlying issue.

== Side effects ==
=== Hypersensitivity ===
Some IV iron preparations can trigger anaphylaxis in patients with certain allergies, but this is extremely rare (less than 1 in 200,000 infusions). Serious hypersensitivity, including anaphylactic reactions, has been reported with the use of high molecular weight iron dextran for intravenous iron infusions. The use of high molecular weight iron dextran has now been abandoned. Patients using Venofer for iron deficiency and anaemia in chronic kidney disease have reported experiences of hypotension, shock, and loss of consciousness. Newer preparations have largely alleviated any association with anaphylaxis. Medicines are prescribed to patients who have experienced hypersensitive reactions to IV iron infusions in the past to prevent this from reoccurring. However, premedication with medications to reduce the risk of hypersensitivity reactions is not usually recommended for most people who receive IV iron. The vast majority of observed infusion reactions with IV iron are caused by complement-activated related pseudoallergy. Slow administration, accompanied by careful patient monitoring during and after the infusion, may reduce the risk.

=== Infection ===
Any form of intravenous infusion carries the risk of infection. Risk is heightened when the equipment being used is not properly sterilised. In intravenous iron infusions, free iron has been shown to potentiate bacterial growth. Evidence associated with intravenous iron therapy and infection is inconclusive. Newer intravenous iron preparations with low free iron concentrations limit the potential risk of infection. It is advised that iron preparations with high free iron concentrations be avoided.

=== Skin ===
Intravenous iron infusions can cause skin rash, hives, itchiness, and flushing. Skin staining and discolouration can occur at the site of infusion if the iron and saline solution leak outside the vein into the surrounding tissue. Skin discolouration can be semi-permanent or permanent.

=== Hypothermia ===
Patients are at risk of hypothermia since large amounts of cold fluid are being infused directly into the bloodstream at a rapid rate. This dramatic temperature change may prompt other side effects such as chest pain, irregular breathing, and muscle aches and pains.

=== Muscle pain ===
People may experience pains and aches in the muscles, specifically in areas near the spine. This can occur up to one or two days after the treatment.

=== Hypophosphatemia ===
IV iron infusions can induce low phosphorus levels in the blood by raising plasma levels of the hormone FGF-23, which promotes increased excretion of phosphorus in the urine. Such reactions more often occur after ferric carboxymaltose than after other IV iron compounds.

=== Asthma ===
IV iron infusions can trigger dyspnoea, wheezing, and chest pain in patients who suffer from asthma.

=== Gastrointestinal ===
IV infusions can bring on nausea, diarrhoea, abdominal pain or cramps, and vomiting.

== Administration ==
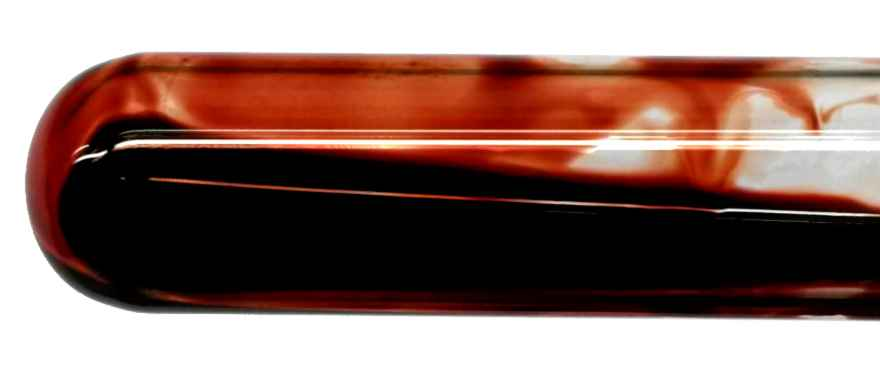
Aqueous ferric thiocyanate (Fe(SCN)n) hydrate mix

Intravenous therapy is a type of parenteral medication. IV iron infusion is a method of delivering a mixed solution of iron and saline from a drip through a needle directly into the vein and bloodstream. The procedure takes place in a medical clinic and may take several hours, depending on the iron preparation that has been prescribed. The patient will receive infusions over the course of several visits until iron stores have been fully replenished.

Patients' temperature, blood pressure, pulse, and breathing rate are monitored constantly for signs of immediate hypersensitivity during and for thirty minutes after treatment. Adverse reactions can be reduced further by premedication, antihistamines and test dosages. Blood tests are taken two to four weeks post-treatment to assess if iron stores have been successfully replenished.

=== Iron preparations ===
There are six types of iron compounds used for IV iron infusion. The iron preparation used is chosen to specifically match the patient's individual needs. Each treatment differs in the duration of its administration, the approved dosage, and the concentration of iron.

Current available intravenous iron preparations
Name	Manufacturer	Iron compound	Molecular weight (Da)	Maximum approved single dosage (mg)	Iron concentration (mg/mL)	Ref.
INFeD	Allergan	Iron dextran	165,000	100	50	
Ferrlecit	Sanofi-Aventis	Sodium ferric gluconate complex	289,000–440,000	125	12.5	
Venofer	American Regent	Iron sucrose	34,000–60,000	200	20	
Feraheme	AMAG Pharmaceuticals	Ferumoxytol	750,000	510	30	
Monoferric	Pharmacosmos Therapeutics	Ferric derisomaltose	155,000	1,000	100	
Injectafer	American Regent	Ferric carboxymaltose	150,000	1,000	50	

Venofer is used for iron deficiency and anaemia in patients with chronic kidney disease. INFeD and Injectafer are iron preparations prescribed to patients who cannot tolerate oral iron supplements or if oral iron has proven ineffective in replenishing iron levels in the blood. Feraheme is used both in patients who have found oral administration to be ineffective and to treat anaemia in patients with chronic kidney disease. Monoferric is prescribed to patients who require an urgent and rapid build-up of iron stores and haemoglobin in the blood.

== History ==
IV iron infusions first came about in the early twentieth century. The earliest intravenous iron solution was ferric hydroxide. Treatment was only recommended in extreme conditions due to its association with toxicity. Ferric hydroxide was identified as toxic because it was found to release free bioactive iron when injected intravenously, increasing risk of infection.

Further research led to the development of iron saccharide in 1947. Testing concluded iron saccharide to be safer and more effective for anaemic patients seeking IV infusions. Later, in 1954, the use of iron dextran became popular, and a product called Imferon emerged. Release of free bioactive iron was minimised by covering the iron oxide core in large dextran molecules. Patients responded well to Imferon, a rapid increase in haemoglobin and iron levels was observed and researchers saw a low incident of side effects compared to previous iron solutions. Large dextran molecules did, however, have a connection to anaphylaxis. As such, an infusion of Imferon was not recommended to patients with a history of allergic reactions, and a test dose was required for all other patients undergoing treatment.

In 1980, a study was completed in the United States on the clinical use of intravenous iron infusions. 471 patients with iron deficiency were treated with IV iron infusions at varying doses. Three patients suffered anaphylactic reactions such as a drop in blood pressure, discolouration of the skin, shortness of breath, and fainting. Researchers concluded that IV infusions should only be used in circumstances where oral iron supplements could not be taken.

Products such as Imferon, which contained high-molecular-weight iron dextran, were the only IV iron products available until the 1990s. Although adverse reactions did occur uncommonly, as such, packaging informed users of possible reactions and highly recommended completing a test dose before further treatment. In 1991, a worldwide recall of high molecular weight iron dextran was enforced after a contaminated batch was leaked. In 1992, it was removed from the market, and manufacturing ceased. During this time, low molecular weight iron dextran was introduced and released for clinical use in 1992. The use of low molecular weight iron dextran was commonplace for renal dialysis patients, and due to its success, usage increased progressively through to 1997.

In 1999, a new compound ferric gluconate was introduced in the form of Ferrlecit. Ferric gluconate was determined to be a safer alternative to high molecular weight iron dextran products with lower rates of serious adverse effects. Iron dextran was attributed to at least thirty-one deaths across the United States and Europe; ferric gluconate had no casualty rates. In November 2000, iron sucrose was introduced in the United States after it had been long used in Europe. Similar to ferric gluconate, iron sucrose did not require a dextran coat, thus minimising the risk associated with anaphylaxis. Over time, intravenous iron infusions have become a significant part of the treatment of anaemia, particularly in hematology and oncology.

In recent years, three new IV iron compounds have been released. These include Injectafer, Monoferric, and Feraheme. All three of these forms of iron can be injected intravenously, restoring blood and iron levels in under 15 minutes.
