= Pagophagy =

Eating of ice

Pagophagy or pagophagia is eating of ice.

The term has the two major usages:

- pagophagia : an eating disorder, a particular case of pica
- normal feeding behavior of some animals

The pagophagic disorder is among the unexplained clinical signs of iron deficiency anemia.

== See also ==
- List of abnormal behaviours in animals
