= Blaud =

Blaud may refer to:

- P. Blaud, French physician who introduced the iron pills.
- Blaud, manager of the US Boulogne football team from 1836 to 1837.
