= Iron deficiency =

State in which a body lacks enough iron to supply its needs

- Other names: Sideropenia, hypoferremia
- Iron in heme
- Specialty: Hematology
- Symptoms: Fatigue, pallor, headache, shortness of breath

Iron deficiency, or sideropenia, is the state in which a body lacks enough iron to supply its needs. Iron is present in all cells in the human body and has several vital functions, such as carrying oxygen to the tissues from the lungs as a key component of the hemoglobin protein, acting as a transport medium for electrons within the cells in the form of cytochromes, and facilitating oxygen enzyme reactions in various tissues. Too little iron can interfere with these vital functions and lead to morbidity and death.

Total body iron averages approximately 3.8 g in men and 2.3 g in women. In blood plasma, iron is carried tightly bound to the protein transferrin. Several mechanisms control iron metabolism and safeguard against iron deficiency. The main regulatory mechanism is situated in the gastrointestinal tract. Most iron absorption occurs in the duodenum, the first section of the small intestine. Several dietary factors may affect iron absorption. Iron deficiency develops when iron loss is not sufficiently compensated by the intake of iron from the diet. When this state is uncorrected, it leads to iron-deficiency anemia, a common type of anemia. Before anemia occurs, the medical condition of iron deficiency without anemia is called latent iron deficiency (LID).

Anemia is a condition characterized by inadequate red blood cells (erythrocytes) or hemoglobin. When the body lacks sufficient amounts of iron, the production of the protein hemoglobin is reduced. Hemoglobin binds to oxygen, enabling red blood cells to supply oxygenated blood throughout the body. Women of childbearing age, children, and people with poor diet are most susceptible to the disease. A primary cause of iron deficiency in non-pregnant women is menstrual bleeding, which accounts for their comparatively higher risk than men. Alongside physical symptoms such as dizziness and shortness of breath, women with iron deficiency may also experience anxiety, depression, and restless leg syndrome.

Most cases of iron deficiency anemia are mild, but if not treated, it can cause problems like an irregular heartbeat, pregnancy complications, and delayed growth in infants and children that could affect their cognitive development and behavior.

== Signs and symptoms ==
Deaths due to iron-deficiency anemia per million persons in 2012 0 1 2–3 4–5 6–8 9–12 13–19 20–30 31–74 75–381

Disability-adjusted life year for iron-deficiency anemia per 100,000 inhabitants in 2004 no data less than 50 50–100 100–150 150–200 200–250 250–300 300–350 350–400 400–450 450–500 500–1000 more than 1000

Symptoms of iron deficiency can occur even before the condition has progressed to iron deficiency anemia.

Symptoms of iron deficiency are not unique to iron deficiency (i.e., not pathognomonic). Iron is needed for many enzymes to function normally, so a wide range of symptoms may eventually emerge, either as a secondary result of anemia or as other primary results of iron deficiency. Common symptoms of iron deficiency include:

- fatigue
- pallor
- headache
- shortness of breath

Less common symptoms of iron deficiency include:

- hair loss
- twitches
- irritability
- weakness
- pica
- tinnitus
- brittle or grooved nails
- hair thinning
- Plummer–Vinson syndrome: painful atrophy of the mucous membrane covering the tongue, the pharynx and the esophagus
- impaired immune function
- pagophagia
- desiderosmia
- restless legs syndrome
- in chronic cases, increase in blood pressure

Continued iron deficiency may progress to anemia and progressive fatigue. Iron deficiency can also cause an elevated platelet count (thrombocytosis). Low iron levels in the blood may make some people ineligible to donate blood.

=== Signs and symptoms in children ===
Iron deficiency in children can progress slowly, and the signs and symptoms may not be obvious. The most common symptom in children is appearing tired and pale.

- pale skin
- fatigue
- slowed growth and development
- poor appetite
- decrease in the size of the testes
- behavioral problems
- abnormal, rapid breathing
- frequent infection

=== Iron requirements in young children to teenagers ===
Age group	Recommended daily amount of iron
7–12 months	11 mg
1–3 years	7 mg
4–8 years	10 mg
9–13 years	8 mg
14–18 years, girls	15 mg
14–18 years, boys	11 mg

== Causes ==
Many factors and health conditions can cause iron deficiency, and in many cases, it can be treated with iron supplements. In women, blood loss from heavy periods is a common cause of iron deficiency. Pregnant women are at risk of iron deficiency. Internal bleeding, such as from an ulcer in the stomach or intestines, is another common cause. Blood loss from donating blood can contribute to iron deficiency. There are also other factors that put people at risk, including:

- blood loss (hemoglobin contains iron)
  - donation
  - excessive menstrual bleeding
  - non-menstrual bleeding
  - bleeding from the gastrointestinal tract (ulcers, hemorrhoids, ulcerative colitis, stomach or colon cancer, etc.)
  - rarely, laryngeal bleeding or bleeding from the respiratory tract
  - cancer
- Diet: inadequate iron intake
- substances (in diet or drugs) interfering with iron absorption
  - Fluoroquinolone antibiotics
- malabsorption syndromes
- inflammation where it is adaptive to limit bacterial growth in infection, but is also present in many other chronic diseases such as inflammatory bowel disease and rheumatoid arthritis
- parasitic infection

A 2024 review examined iron metabolism and its interactions with calcium, magnesium, and selected trace elements (copper, zinc, lead, cadmium, mercury, and nickel), as well as their roles in certain diseases.

A 2008 study by researchers at Harvard Medical School identified mutations in the TMPRSS6 gene — encoding the enzyme matriptase-2 — as the cause of iron-refractory iron deficiency anemia (IRIDA), a rare autosomal recessive disorder characterized by iron deficiency unresponsive to oral iron supplementation.

=== Athletics ===
Possible reasons that athletics may contribute to lower iron levels include mechanical hemolysis (destruction of red blood cells from physical impact), loss of iron through sweat and urine, gastrointestinal blood loss, and haematuria (presence of blood in urine). Although small amounts of iron are excreted in sweat and urine, these losses can generally be seen as insignificant even with increased sweat and urine production, especially considering that athletes' bodies appear to become conditioned to retain iron better. Mechanical hemolysis is most likely to occur in high-impact sports, especially among long-distance runners who experience "foot-strike hemolysis" from the repeated impact of their feet with the ground. Exercise-induced gastrointestinal bleeding is most likely to occur in endurance athletes. Haematuria in athletes is most likely to occur in those who undergo repetitive impacts on the body, particularly affecting the feet (such as running on a hard road, or Kendo) and hands (e.g., Conga or Candombe drumming). Additionally, athletes in sports that emphasize weight loss (e.g. ballet, gymnastics, marathon running, and cycling) as well as sports that emphasize high-carbohydrate, low-fat diets, may be at an increased risk for iron deficiency.

=== Inadequate dietary intake ===
A U.S. federal food consumption survey found that for women and men over 19, average iron consumption from foods and beverages was 13.1 and 18.0 mg/day, respectively. For women, 16% in the age range 14–50 years consumed less than the Estimated Average Requirement (EAR), and for men aged 19 and up, fewer than 3%. Consumption data were updated in a 2014 U.S. government survey and reported that for men and women ages 20 and older the average iron intakes were, respectively, 16.6 and 12.6 mg/day. People in the U.S. usually obtain adequate amounts of iron from their diets. However, subgroups like infants, young children, teenage girls, pregnant women, and premenopausal women are at risk of obtaining less than the EAR. Socio-economic and racial differences further affect the rates of iron deficiency.

== Bioavailability ==
Iron is needed for bacterial growth, making its bioavailability an important factor in controlling infection. Blood plasma as a result carries iron tightly bound to transferrin, which is taken up by cells by endocytosing transferrin, thus preventing its access to bacteria. Between 15 and 20 percent of the protein content in human milk consists of lactoferrin that binds iron. Lactoferrin is also concentrated in tears, saliva, and wounds to bind iron to limit bacterial growth. Egg white contains 12% conalbumin to withhold it from bacteria that get through the eggshell (for this reason, before antibiotics, egg white was used to treat infections).

To reduce bacterial growth, plasma concentrations of iron are lowered in a variety of systemic inflammatory states due to increased production of hepcidin, which is mainly released by the liver in response to increased production of pro-inflammatory cytokines such as interleukin-6. This functional iron deficiency will resolve once the source of inflammation is rectified; however, if not resolved, it can progress to anemia of chronic inflammation. The underlying inflammation can be caused by fever, inflammatory bowel disease, infections, chronic heart failure (CHF), carcinomas, or following surgery.

Reflecting this link between iron bioavailability and bacterial growth, taking oral iron supplements over 200 mg/day causes a relative overabundance of iron that can alter the types of bacteria present within the gut. There have been concerns regarding parenteral iron being administered whilst bacteremia is present, although this has not been borne out in clinical practice. A moderate iron deficiency, in contrast, can protect against acute infection, especially against organisms that reside within hepatocytes and macrophages, such as malaria and tuberculosis. This is mainly beneficial in regions with a high prevalence of these diseases and where standard treatment is unavailable.

== Diagnosis ==
- A complete blood count can reveal microcytic anemia, although this is not always present – even when iron deficiency progresses to iron-deficiency anemia.
- Low serum ferritin (see below)
- Low serum iron
- High TIBC (total iron binding capacity), although this can be elevated in cases of anemia of chronic inflammation.
- It is possible that the fecal occult blood test might be positive if iron deficiency is the result of gastrointestinal bleeding; although the sensitivity of the test may mean that in some cases it will be negative even with enteral blood loss.

As always, laboratory values must be interpreted with the lab's reference values in mind and considering all aspects of the individual clinical situation.

Serum ferritin can be elevated in inflammatory conditions; so a normal serum ferritin may not always exclude iron deficiency, and the utility is improved by taking a concurrent C-reactive protein (CRP). The serum ferritin level viewed as "high" depends on the condition. For example, in inflammatory bowel disease the threshold is 100, whereas in chronic heart failure (CHF) the levels are 200.

== Treatment ==
Before commencing treatment, there should be a definitive diagnosis of the underlying cause of iron deficiency. This is particularly the case in older patients, who are most susceptible to colorectal cancer and the gastrointestinal bleeding it often causes. In adults, 60% of patients with iron-deficiency anemia may have underlying gastrointestinal disorders leading to chronic blood loss. It is likely that the cause of the iron deficiency will need treatment as well.

Upon diagnosis, the condition can be treated with iron supplements. The choice of the supplement will depend upon both the severity of the condition, the required speed of improvement (e.g., if awaiting elective surgery), and the likelihood of treatment being effective (e.g., if the patient has underlying inflammatory bowel disease (IBD), is undergoing dialysis, or is having erythropoiesis-stimulating agent (ESA) therapy).

Commonly-used forms of oral iron are ferrous sulfate, ferrous gluconate, or amino acid chelate tablets. Recent research suggests the replacement dose of iron, at least in the elderly with iron deficiency, may be as little as 15 mg per day of elemental iron.

Low-certainty evidence suggests that IBD-related anemia treatment with intravenous (IV) iron infusion may be more effective than oral iron therapy, with fewer people needing to stop treatment early due to adverse effects. The type of iron preparation may be an important determinant of clinical benefit. Moderate-certainty evidence suggests response to treatment may be higher when IV ferric carboxymaltose, rather than IV iron sucrose preparation is used, despite very-low certainty evidence of increased adverse effects, including bleeding, in those receiving ferric carboxymaltose treatment.

Ferric maltol, marketed as Accrufer and Ferracru, is available in oral and IV preparations. When used as a treatment for IBD-related anemia, very low certainty evidence suggests a marked benefit with oral ferric maltol compared with placebo. However, it was unclear whether the IV preparation was more effective than oral ferric maltol.

A Cochrane review of controlled trials comparing IV iron therapy with oral iron supplements in people with chronic kidney disease, found low-certainty evidence that people receiving IV-iron treatment were 1.71 times as likely to reach their target hemoglobin levels. Overall, hemoglobin was 0.71 g/dl higher than that of those treated with oral iron supplements. Iron stores in the liver, estimated by serum ferritin, were also 224.84 μg/L higher in those receiving IV-iron. However, there was also low-certainty evidence that allergic reactions were more likely following IV-iron therapy. It was unclear whether the type of iron therapy administration affects the risk of death from any cause, including cardiovascular, or whether it may alter the number of people who may require a blood transfusion or dialysis.

=== Food sources ===
Mild iron deficiency can be prevented or corrected by eating iron-rich foods and cooking in an iron skillet. Because iron is a requirement for most plants and animals, a wide range of foods provide iron. Good sources of dietary iron have heme iron, as this is most easily absorbed and is not inhibited by medication or other dietary components. Two examples are red meat and poultry. Non-heme sources contain iron, though the iron is less bioavailable. Examples are lentils, beans, leafy vegetables, pistachios, tofu, fortified bread, and fortified breakfast cereals.

Iron from different foods is absorbed and processed differently by the body; for instance, iron in meat (heme iron source) is more easily absorbed than iron in grains and vegetables ("non-heme" iron sources). Minerals and chemicals in one type of food may also inhibit absorption of iron from another type of food eaten at the same time. For example, oxalates and phytic acid form insoluble complexes which bind iron in the gut before it can be absorbed.

Because iron from plant sources is less easily absorbed than the heme-bound iron of animal sources, vegetarians and vegans should have a somewhat higher total daily iron intake than those who eat meat, fish, or poultry. Legumes and dark-green leafy vegetables like broccoli, kale, and Asian greens are especially good sources of iron for vegetarians and vegans. However, spinach and Swiss chard contain oxalates that bind iron, making them almost entirely unavailable for absorption. Iron from non-heme sources is more readily absorbed if consumed with foods that contain either heme-bound iron or vitamin C. This is due to a hypothesized "meat factor" which enhances iron absorption.The benefits of eating seasonings or condiments that have been fortified with iron for people with iron deficiencies are not clear. There is some evidence that iron-fortified condiments or seasonings may help reduce an iron deficiency; however, whether this improves a person's health and prevents the person from developing anemia is not clear.

Following are two tables showing the richest foods in heme and non-heme iron. The "% RDA" column is based on the USDA Recommended Dietary Allowance of 18 mg for women aged between 19 and 50, and 8 mg for men aged 19 and older as well as women aged 51 and older.

Richest foods in heme iron
			% RDA	
Food	Serving size	Iron	18 mg	8 mg
Pork liver	3 oz (85 g)	15.2 mg	84%	190%
Lamb kidney	3 oz (85 g)	10.2 mg	57%	128%
Octopus	3 oz (85 g)	8.1 mg	45%	101%
Lamb liver	3 oz (85 g)	7 mg	39%	88%
Cooked oyster	3 oz (85 g)	6.6 mg	37%	83%
Mussel	3 oz (85 g)	5.7 mg	32%	71%
Beef liver	3 oz (85 g)	5.5 mg	31%	69%
Duck breast	3 oz (85 g)	3.8 mg	21%	48%
Bison	3 oz (85 g)	2.9 mg	16%	36%
Beef	3 oz (85 g)	2.5 mg	14%	31%
Clams (Note: Iron content in clams can vary considerably between types and modes of preparation, and the presence of aluminum could reduce iron bioavailability. The bioaccumulation of heavy metals in clams from highly contaminated areas may make regular consumption unsafe in the long term.)	3 oz (85 g)	2.4 mg	13%	30%
Lamb	3 oz (85 g)	2 mg	11%	25%

Richest foods in non-heme iron
Food	Serving size	Iron	% guideline
Raw yellow beans	100 g	7 mg	35%
Spirulina	15 g	4.3 mg	24%
Falafel	140 g	4.8 mg	24%
Soybean kernels	125 mL (~1/2 cup)	4.6 mg	23%
Spinach	125 g	4.4 mg	22%
Lentil	125 mL (~1/2 cup)	3.5 mg	17.5%
Treacle (CSR Australia)	20 mL (1 tbsp)	3.4 mg	17%
Rye bread	100 g	2.8 mg	14%
Buckwheat	100 g	2.2 mg	11%
Molasses (Bluelabel Australia)	20 mL (1 tbsp)	1.8 mg	9%
Candied ginger root	15 g	1.7 mg	8.5%
Toasted sesame seeds	10 g	1.4 mg	7%
Cocoa (dry powder)	5 g	0.8 mg	4%

==== Food recommendations for children ====
Children at 6 months should start having solid food that contains enough iron, which could be found in both heme and non-heme iron.

Heme iron:

- Red meat (for example, beef, pork, lamb, goat, or venison)
- Fatty fish
- Poultry (for example, chicken or turkey)
- Eggs

Non-heme iron:

- Iron-fortified infant cereals
- Tofu
- Beans and lentils
- Dark green leafy vegetables

Iron deficiency can have serious health consequences that diet may not be able to quickly correct; hence, an iron supplement is often necessary if the iron deficiency has become symptomatic.

=== Blood transfusion ===
Blood transfusion is sometimes used to treat iron deficiency with hemodynamic instability. Sometimes transfusions are considered for people who have chronic iron deficiency or who will soon go to surgery, but even if such people have low hemoglobin, they should be given oral treatment or intravenous iron.

Intravenous iron therapy for non-anemic, iron-deficient adults

Current evidence is limited to support the recommendation that intravenous iron therapy is beneficial for non-anemic, iron-deficient adults. Further research in this area is needed as the current body of evidence is very low quality.

== Cancer research ==
The presence of Helicobacter pylori in the stomach can cause inflammation and can lower the threshold for the development of gastric cancer. In the setting of iron deficiency, H. pylori causes more severe inflammation and the development of premalignant lesions. This inflammatory effect appears to be mediated, in part, through altered bile acid production including an increase in deoxycholic acid, a secondary bile acid implicated in colon cancer and other gastrointestinal cancers.

== See also ==
- Haemochromatosis – a condition in which the body stores too much iron
- Bahima disease
- CO_{2} fertilization effect
