= Pagophagia =

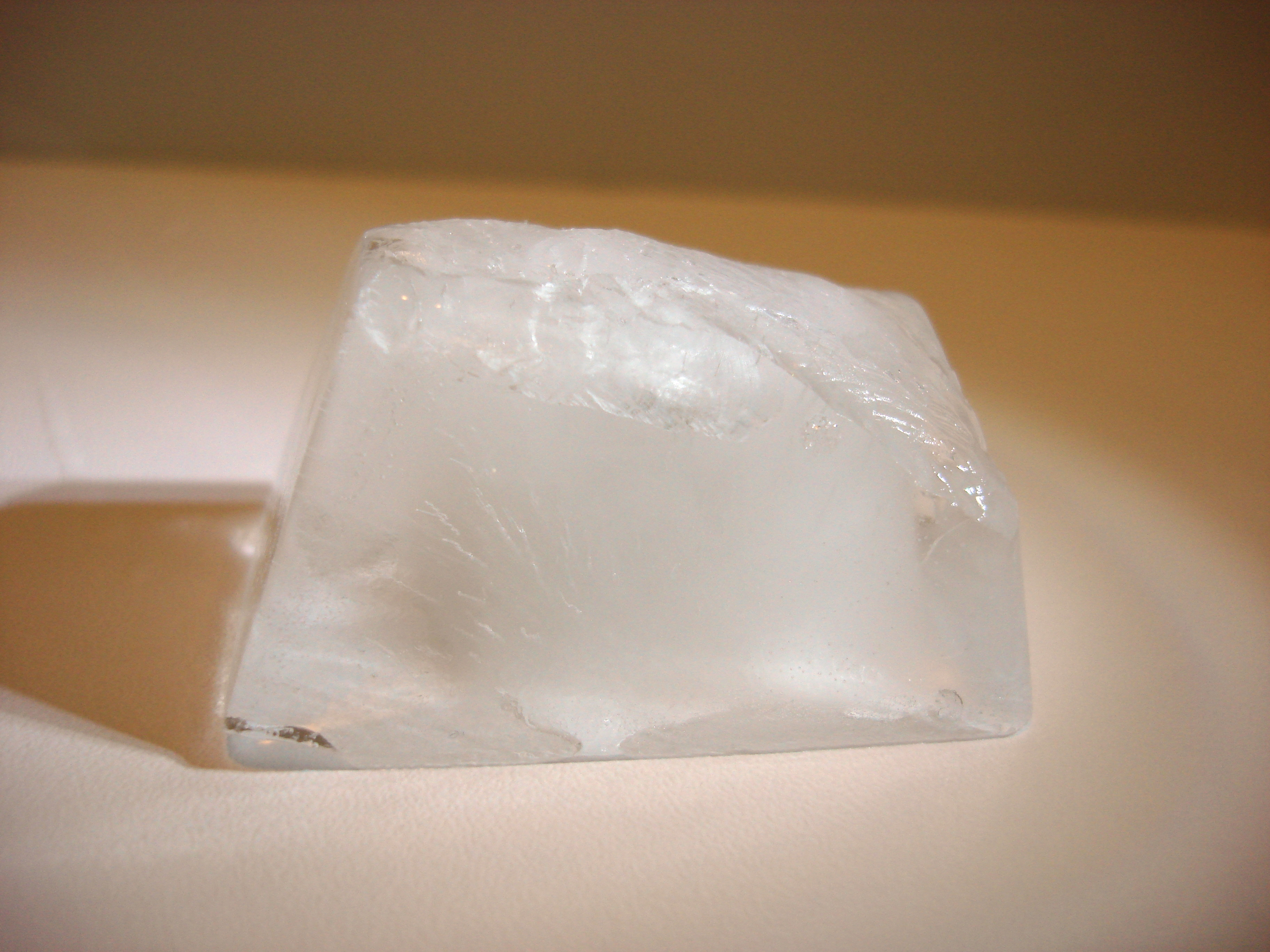
- Symptoms: Compulsive consumption of ice
- Complications: Dental injury, worsening iron deficiency or other micronutrient deficiency, hyponatremia
- Causes: Unknown etiology, maybe caused by nutritional deficiencies such as zinc or calcium, or by psychological problems such as OCD.
- Risk factors: Iron-deficiency anemia, psychological distress, pregnancy
- Diagnostic method: Based on signs and symptoms presented and blood tests such as a complete blood count
- Treatment: Iron supplementation

Pagophagia (from Greek: pagos, frost/ice, + phagō, to eat) is the compulsive consumption of ice or iced drinks. It is a form of the disorder known as pica, which in Latin refers to a magpie that eats everything indiscriminately. Pica's medical definition refers to the persistent consumption of nonnutritive substances, ice in this case, for over a period of at least one month. However, different studies have included alternative definitions for pagophagia, including "daily consumption of 2–11 full glasses of ice (480–2640 g)" or "the purposeful ingestion of at least one ordinary tray of ice daily for a period in excess of two months." It has been shown to be associated with iron-deficiency anemia and responsive to iron supplementation, leading some investigators to postulate that some forms of pica may be the result of nutritional deficiency.

Similarly, folk wisdom also maintained that pica reflected an appetite to compensate for nutritional deficiencies, such as low iron or zinc. In iron deficient pregnant women who experience symptoms of pagophagia, decreased cravings for ice have been observed after iron supplementation. Later research demonstrated that the substances ingested by those who have pica generally do not provide the mineral or nutrient in which people are deficient. In the long run, as people start consuming more nonfoods compulsively, pica can also cause additional nutritional deficiencies.

A hypothesis of the neurological basis of pagophagia was proposed in a 2014 study in which those with iron deficiency anemia were shown to have improved response times while performing on a neuropsychological test when given ice to chew on. As a result, the researchers hypothesized that chewing on ice causes vascular changes that allow for increased perfusion of the brain, as well as activation of the sympathetic nervous system, which also increases blood flow to the brain, allowing for increased processing speed and alertness.

Although some investigators also hypothesize that chewing ice may lessen pain in glossitis and stomatitis related to iron-deficiency anemia, the specific pathophysiology is still unknown and this hypothesis remains controversial. The American Dental Association recommends not chewing ice as it can lead to dental injury and suggests that ice should be allowed to melt in the mouth instead.

== Signs and symptoms ==
The main symptom for pagophagia is intense cravings for chewing ice. Those with pagophagia will find themselves constantly chewing on ice cubes, shaved ice or even frost from the fridge. Since a common underlying cause of pagophagia is iron-deficiency anemia, many people with the disorder will also experience weakness, fatigue, pallor, sore tongue, dizziness, headache, and cold extremities. Other symptoms associated with iron deficiency may include brittle nails, cracking at the corner of the mouth, and restless legs syndrome. Severe cases of iron deficiency can also cause the body to make up for decreased oxygen-carrying capacity of the blood by increasing cardiac output. Thus, palpitations, angina, as well as shortness of breath may also present, specially if there is a preexisting cardiovascular disease or condition. Excess water intake from any source can lead to hyponatremia and has been noted in at least one case study.

== Causes ==
=== Iron deficiency ===
Although compulsive consumption of ice is frequently associated with a deficiency of iron, the exact etiology of this form of pica is not well-understood. There is one hypothesis that states consumption of ice activates a vasoconstrictive response which causes an increase of blood flow to the brain. Because fatigue is the most common symptom experienced in iron-deficiency anemia due to decreased levels of oxygen delivered to the brain, the increase of blood flow to the brain through consumption of ice is thought to increase alertness and improve the symptoms of fatigue. In support of this hypothesis, individuals with iron-deficient anemia were found to have improved response times on neuropsychological tests than compared to healthy controls when chewing ice.

Reports have demonstrated the improvement or resolution of pagophagia when given iron supplementation. People with iron-deficiency anemia who showed symptoms of pagophagia had complete resolution of their symptoms when their iron levels were treated, suggesting the association between serum iron levels and symptoms of pagophagia. In another case, an individual who presented with pagophagia was prescribed 325mg tablets of ferrous sulfate twice daily. The individual was also administered 1000mg of low molecular weight dextran over 1 hour and their symptoms of pagophagia were immediately resolved. In another case, a woman with iron-deficiency anemia related to gynecological bleeding was admitted and her dietary screening showed consumption of about 80 ice cubes per day for the past 5 years. She was given iron supplementation and her anemia was treated along with the disappearance of pagophagia within two weeks.

One study looked at the relationship between pagophagia and H. pylori infection in those with iron deficiency anemia. It was found that pagophagia does not increase the risk of H. pylori infections in that specific population. In addition, H. pylori infection and pagophagia did not have a synergistic effect on the development of iron absorption abnormalities in the intestines.

=== Calcium deficiency ===
Pagophagia has been often reported with calcium deficiency but its pathophysiology is unknown.

=== Psychological and physiological distress ===
In several cases, pagophagia has been associated with certain psychological conditions such as compulsive behavior or depressive disorder where pagophagia was used as a coping mechanism to deal with psychological stress. Some suggestions for other causes of pagophagia include hunger and gastrointestinal distress related to ways the body attempts to ease the stress.

Other known risk factors for pica include "stress, cultural factors, learned behavior, low socioeconomic status, underlying mental health disorder, nutritional deficiency, child neglect, pregnancy, epilepsy, [and] familial psychopathology."

In one case report, a 42-year-old woman presented with complaints of freezer frost and eating ice. She developed a habit of eating 10 to 12 ice cubes and freezer frost each day, and eventually increased her consumption to 25 to 30 ice cubes each day. Her medical assessment revealed no past or family history of any chronic psychiatric disorder or physical disorder. Her hemoglobin, serum calcium, and stool examination were normal. One suspected cause of her pagophagia was psychological stress, the stressor being her son's annual examinations. The woman was previously prescribed venlafaxine 50mg and vitamin B-complex for two to six weeks but with no improvement. The doctor initiated fluoxetine 20mg daily for her and the venlafaxine was tapered off. The dose was increased to 30mg after three weeks and counseling and behavioral treatment was given. Her pagophagia resolved after four months. Along with this case, previous reports have shown selective serotonin reuptake inhibitors effective in treating pagophagia. Counseling and behavioral strategies such as positive and negative reinforcement should be utilized for people with psychiatric conditions.

== Diagnosis ==
Pagophagia may often go undiagnosed as those with the condition may consider it to be harmless and not seek medical help unless the behavior begins to interfere with their lives. However, the disorder is not as harmless as it seems since underlying medical causes that remain undiagnosed may lead to complications. For example, if anemia is not treated properly, the heart will need to exert more force in order to supply adequate oxygen throughout the body which can progress to heart failure. Other complications of pagophagia include tooth sensitivity and dental injury leading to cracked or chipped teeth. Overconsumption of ice may cause bloating, gas, and stomach pain. Imaging exams such as abdominal x-rays and endoscopy may be ordered if a person presents with abdominal symptoms.

Due to the relation between pagophagia and iron deficiency anemia, diagnosis begins with obtaining a medical history, a physical exam as well as blood tests that includes a complete blood count and additional tests to determine levels of hemoglobin, hematocrit, serum iron, and ferritin, a protein that helps the body store iron. In individuals that are anemic, the tests would show results with lower than normal levels which would then confirm the diagnosis. If a blood slide is ordered by the doctor, it may show red blood cells that are smaller and paler than normal cells. In the case of severe iron deficiency, white blood cell count may also be low.

A differential diagnosis for psychiatric conditions should be performed in the setting of pagophagia. Schizophrenia and psychosis, other eating disorders, substance use, and autism should be considered in the differential diagnosis.

=== Implications for practice ===
When screening for suspected pagophagia, it may be appropriate to include screening for iron deficiency. Screening for pagophagia may help clinicians gather valuable information towards the diagnosis and treatment, especially populations who are at risk, for iron deficiency. Women who are menstruating, pregnant, or lactating may benefit from pagophagia screening because of the high occurrence of iron deficiency in these groups. Other groups at risk due to prevalence of iron deficiency include blood donors, individuals who are post-surgery or trauma, or people who experience malabsorption of iron. Collecting information during health screening to determine any causes of blood loss, malabsorption of iron from the diet, and any laboratory tests to determine iron deficiency may be appropriate in people who present with symptoms of pagophagia. If iron deficiency is confirmed by laboratory screening, iron replacement therapy can be considered with oral supplementation. Over the counter or prescription formulations of iron containing ferrous gluconate, ferrous sulfate, or ferrous fumarate are available.

== Epidemiology ==
=== Pagophagia in iron-deficiency anemia ===
In one study of pica in iron deficient versus iron replete blood donors, "pica was reported in 11% of donors with iron depletion/deficiency, compared with 4% of iron-replete donors," with pagophagia accounting for 94% of reported pica cases. A case series of pagophagia in men with iron-deficiency anemia concluded "that pagophagia occurred in 34% of men with iron-deficiency anemia." Men who were older and had higher platelet counts were less likely to have pagophagia compared to younger men and those with lower platelet counts.

=== Pregnancy ===
In women, pica is "most often seen during pregnancy," with estimates of 27.8% of pregnant women experiencing pica, but pica prevalence and manifestation is culturally and geographically heterogenous. A study of pregnant women in Tehran, Iran found pica in 8.33% of the study population with pagophagia accounting for 76% of observed pica cases. Logistic regression showed a positive correlation between pica in pregnancy with pregnancy complications, lower educational attainment, and use of iron supplementation. A study of pica in pregnant Mexican-born women living in either the United States or Mexico found differing rates of pagophagy between the two groups.

=== Children ===
A meta-analysis of the prevalence of pica in German children found that 12.3% of German children "have engaged with a pica behavior at some point in their lives," but did not specify the types of pica observed. Despite pica being observed in young children, it is also a common eating disorder among those who are intellectually impaired. Thus, proper diagnosis of pica is essential, requiring the children to be at least above two years of age, as it is more common to see children younger than two consuming nonnutritive substances. In children, pica is usually short term and will disappear spontaneously. In terms of studies regarding a specific type of pica, a cross-sectional study of American children receiving chronic hemodialysis therapy found that 34.5% of the children studied engaged in pagophagy compared to 12.6% of children who engaged in other forms of pica.
