= Sucrosomial iron =

Sucrosomial iron is a new oral iron preparation containing ferric pyrophosphate covered by phospholipids plus sucrose ester of fatty acid matrix. This allows the molecule to be absorbed in the gastrointestinal tract by trans-cellular, para-cellular and M-cells independently of hepcidin and due to gastro-resistant properties, it does not cause the side effects such as gastric irritation which is commonly associated to oral iron.

The higher bioavailability of sucrosomial iron means that a lower oral iron dose can be used to be achieving a similar improvement in trasferrin levels.
