= Desiderosmia =

Craving for particular smells

Desiderosmia is a craving for particular sharp or pungent smells, including the smells of such inedible substances as rubber tires, menthol, gasoline, bleach and domestic cleaning products, without the desire to taste or eat the substances in question.

Desiderosmia can be a symptom of iron deficiency. It has been observed in pregnant women with low iron levels. Desiderosmia has also been observed in some cases of major depression without iron deficiency. In both cases, treating the underlying condition relieved the symptom of desiderosmia.

There are a number of hypotheses for physiological mechanisms for this craving, but a cause has not yet been determined.

The condition has been compared to pica, the consumption of non-nutritive substances, but is a distinct condition.
