= Sodium ferric gluconate complex =

Clinical data
- Trade names: Ferrlecit
- AHFS/Drugs.com: Monograph
- MedlinePlus: a614030
- License data: US DailyMed: Ferrlecit
- Routes of administration: Intravenous (IV)
- ATC code: B03AC (WHO)

Legal status
- Legal status: US: ℞-only

Identifiers
- CAS Number: 34089-81-1
- PubChem CID: 76968835
- DrugBank: DB09517
- ChemSpider: 34989638
- UNII: CC9149U2QX
- KEGG: D05859
- CompTox Dashboard (EPA): DTXSID80187686

Chemical and physical data
- Formula: C_{66}H_{121}Fe_{2}NaO_{65}
- Molar mass: 2089.309 g·mol^{−1}
- 3D model (JSmol): Interactive image
- SMILES: O[C@H]([C@@H](O)C(O[Na])=O)[C@H](O)[C@H](O)CO.O[C@H]([C@@H](O)C(O1)=O)[C@H](O)[C@H](O)CO.[Fe]1(OC(=O)[C@H](O)[C@@H](O)[C@H](O)[C@H](O)CO)OC(=O)[C@H](O)[C@@H](O)[C@H](O)[C@H](O)CO
- InChI: InChI=1S/5C12H22O11.C6H12O7.2Fe.Na.3O/c5*13-1-4-6(16)8(18)9(19)11(21-4)23-12(3-15)10(20)7(17)5(2-14)22-12;7-1-2(8)3(9)4(10)5(11)6(12)13;;;;;;/h5*4-11,13-20H,1-3H2;2-5,7-11H,1H2,(H,12,13);;;;;;/q;;;;;;2*+3;+1;3*-2/p-1/t5*4-,5-,6-,7-,8+,9-,10+,11-,12+;2-,3-,4+,5-;;;;;;/m111111....../s1; Key:MQBDAEHWGRMADS-XNHLMZCASA-M

Sodium ferric gluconate complex, sold under the brand name Ferrlecit, is an intravenously administered iron medication for the treatment of iron deficiency anemia in adults and in children aged six years and older with chronic kidney disease receiving hemodialysis who are receiving supplemental epoetin therapy. The macromolecule has an apparent molecular weight of 289,000–440,000 Dalton.

The most common side effects in adults are nausea, vomiting and/or diarrhea, injection site reaction, hypotension, cramps, hypertension, dizziness, dyspnea, chest pain, leg cramps, and pain. In children the most common side effects are hypotension, headache, hypertension, tachycardia and vomiting.
