= Ferric derisomaltose =

Medication

Clinical data
- Trade names: Monoferric, Monofer
- Other names: FDI
- AHFS/Drugs.com: Monograph
- License data: US DailyMed: Ferric derisomaltose
- Routes of administration: Intravenous
- ATC code: None

Legal status
- Legal status: AU: S4 (Prescription only); CA: ℞-only; US: ℞-only

Identifiers
- IUPAC name: iron(3+);(2S,3R,4R,5R)-6-[(2S,3R,4S,5S,6R)-3,4,5-trihydroxy-6-[[(2S,3R,4S,5S,6R)-3,4,5-trihydroxy-6-(hydroxymethyl)oxan-2-yl]oxymethyl]oxan-2-yl]oxyhexane-1,2,3,4,5-pentol
- CAS Number: 1345510-43-1
- PubChem CID: 86278348
- DrugBank: DB15617
- UNII: AHU547PI9H
- KEGG: D11808

Chemical and physical data
- Formula: C_{18}H_{34}FeO_{16}^{+3}
- Molar mass: 562.299 g·mol^{−1}
- 3D model (JSmol): Interactive image
- SMILES: C(C1C(C(C(C(O1)OCC2C(C(C(C(O2)OCC(C(C(C(CO)O)O)O)O)O)O)O)O)O)O)O.[Fe+3]
- InChI: InChI=1S/C18H34O16.Fe/c19-1-5(21)9(23)10(24)6(22)3-31-17-16(30)14(28)12(26)8(34-17)4-32-18-15(29)13(27)11(25)7(2-20)33-18;/h5-30H,1-4H2;/q;+3/t5-,6+,7+,8+,9+,10+,11+,12+,13-,14-,15+,16+,17-,18-;/m0./s1; Key:JTQTXQSGPZRXJF-DOJSGGEQSA-N

Ferric derisomaltose, sold under the brand name Monoferric among others, is a medication for the treatment of iron deficiency anemia in adults who have intolerance to oral iron or have had unsatisfactory response to oral iron or who have non-hemodialysis dependent chronic kidney disease (NDD-CKD). It was approved for use in the United States in January 2020. It is given intravenously.
