= P. Blaud =

French Doctor

Jean-Pierre or Pierre Blaud (1773/1774, Nîmes – 8 May 1859, Beaucaire), often seen as P. Blaud of/de Beaucaire was a French doctor of medicine who in 1832 introduced and started the use of Blaud's pills or iron pills as a medication for patients with anemia. Blaud of Beaucaire was one of the leading physicians at the Hospital of Beaucaire (l'Hospital de Beaucaire) in France.
