= Ferric maltol =

Chemical compound

Clinical data
- Trade names: Feraccru, others
- AHFS/Drugs.com: Monograph
- License data: US DailyMed: Ferric maltol
- Routes of administration: By mouth
- Drug class: Hematologic agent
- ATC code: B03AB10 (WHO)

Legal status
- Legal status: CA: ℞-only; UK: POM (Prescription only); US: ℞-only; EU: Rx-only; In general: ℞ (Prescription only)

Pharmacokinetic data
- Metabolism: Glucuronidation (maltol)
- Elimination half-life: 0.7 hrs (maltol)
- Excretion: Urine (maltol)

Identifiers
- IUPAC name: Iron(3+) tris(2-methyl-4-oxo-4H-pyran-3-olate)
- CAS Number: 33725-54-1
- PubChem CID: 169535
- DrugBank: DB876
- ChemSpider: 148265
- UNII: MA10QYF1Z0
- KEGG: D10833
- CompTox Dashboard (EPA): DTXSID10955335

Chemical and physical data
- Formula: C_{18}H_{15}FeO_{9}
- Molar mass: 431.154 g·mol^{−1}
- 3D model (JSmol): Interactive image
- SMILES: CC1=C(C(=O)C=CO1)[O-].CC1=C(C(=O)C=CO1)[O-].CC1=C(C(=O)C=CO1)[O-].[Fe+3]
- InChI: InChI=1S/3C6H6O3.Fe/c3*1-4-6(8)5(7)2-3-9-4;/h3*2-3,8H,1H3;/q;;;+3/p-3; Key:AHPWLYJHTFAWKI-UHFFFAOYSA-K

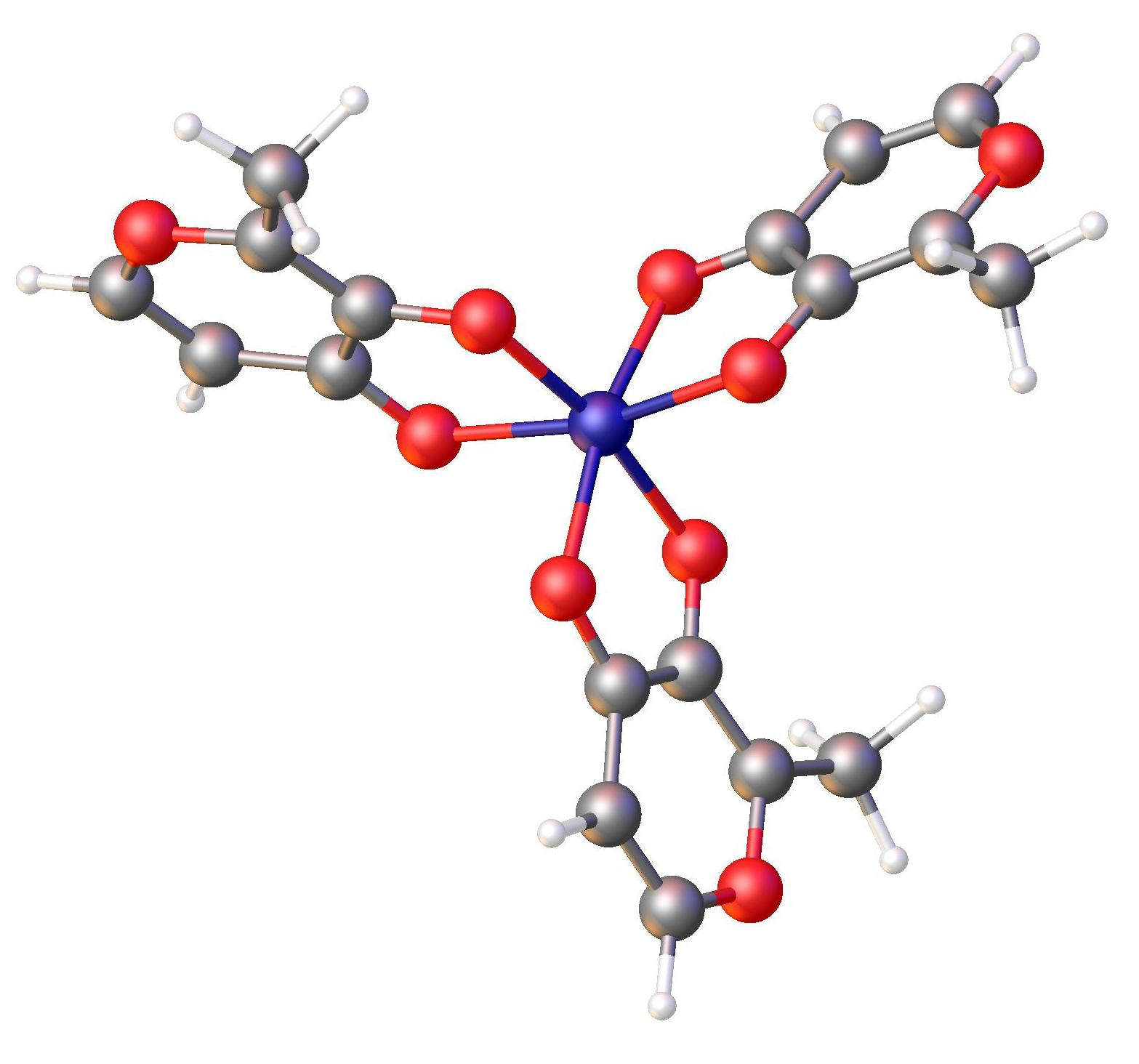
Structure of Fe(maltol-H)_{3}. Color code: red = O, gray = C, blue = Fe.

Ferric maltol, sold under the brand name Feraccru among others, is an iron containing medication for the treatment of people with low iron stores. It is taken by mouth.

== Medical uses ==
Ferric maltol is indicated for the treatment of iron deficiency.

== Contraindications ==
Ferric maltol is contraindicated in people with hereditary hemochromatosis and other kinds of iron overload, as well as those repeatedly receiving blood transfusions.

== Side effects ==
The most common side effects are flatulence (in 5% of people taking the drug), diarrhea (4%), constipation (4%), stool color change (4%), nausea (3%), vomiting (3%), and abdominal discomfort, bloating and pain (1%). Ferric maltol may cause serious side effects including increased risk of inflammatory bowel disease flare and iron overload in the body.

== Interactions ==
No systematic interaction studies with ferric maltol have been conducted. Food reduces its uptake from the gut, as do calcium and magnesium salts and tetracycline antibiotics. Conversely, iron inhibits the uptake of many drugs, such as bisphosphonates, tetracycline antibiotics, quinolone antibiotics, levothyroxin, and levodopa. Combining the drug with intravenous iron can result in fast release of iron into the blood, potentially leading to low blood pressure or even collapse.

Dimercaprol in combination with iron is toxic for the kidneys. The antibiotic chloramphenicol interferes with incorporation of iron into red blood cells and with iron excretion. Furthermore, iron can reduce the blood pressure lowering effects of methyldopa.

Maltol is metabolized by the enzyme UGT1A6. It is not known whether inhibitors of this enzyme increase maltol concentrations in the body.

== Pharmacology ==
=== Mechanism of action ===
Ferric maltol acts as a source of iron, which is essential for oxygen transport in the blood and other processes in the human body.

=== Pharmacokinetics ===
The substance is a complex of iron with maltol, which is absorbed from the gut and then dissociates, releasing iron and maltol separately into the bloodstream. Iron is bound to transferrin and reaches its highest concentrations in the blood plasma one to three hours after ingestion. It is also bound to ferritin for storage. Maltol reaches its highest plasma concentrations after 1 to 1.5 hours. It is quickly metabolized to the glucuronide by UGT1A6 and eliminated via the urine with a biological half-life of 0.7 hours. 40–60% are excreted in the glucuronidized form.

== History ==
Ferric maltol was approved for medical use in the European Union in February 2016.

Ferric maltol was approved for medical use in the United States in July 2019, based on evidence from three clinical trials (NCT01340872, NCT01352221, and NCT02968368). All 295 participants had low iron stores in the body and consequent iron deficiency anemia. In the first two trials low iron was caused by participants' inflammatory bowel disease and in the last trial, by long standing (chronic) kidney disease. Trials were conducted at 79 sites in Europe and the United States.

The efficacy of ferric maltol to treat iron deficiency in people aged 10-17 years of age was assessed in the FORTIS trial (NCT05126901). The trial treated 24 participants with age-based dosing of ferric maltol twice daily, and showed a clinically meaningful average increase in hemoglobin of 1.1 g/dL at week 12. This, on average, would be the expected increase in hemoglobin with one blood transfusion.
