= Iron sucrose =

Intravenous treatment for iron deficiency

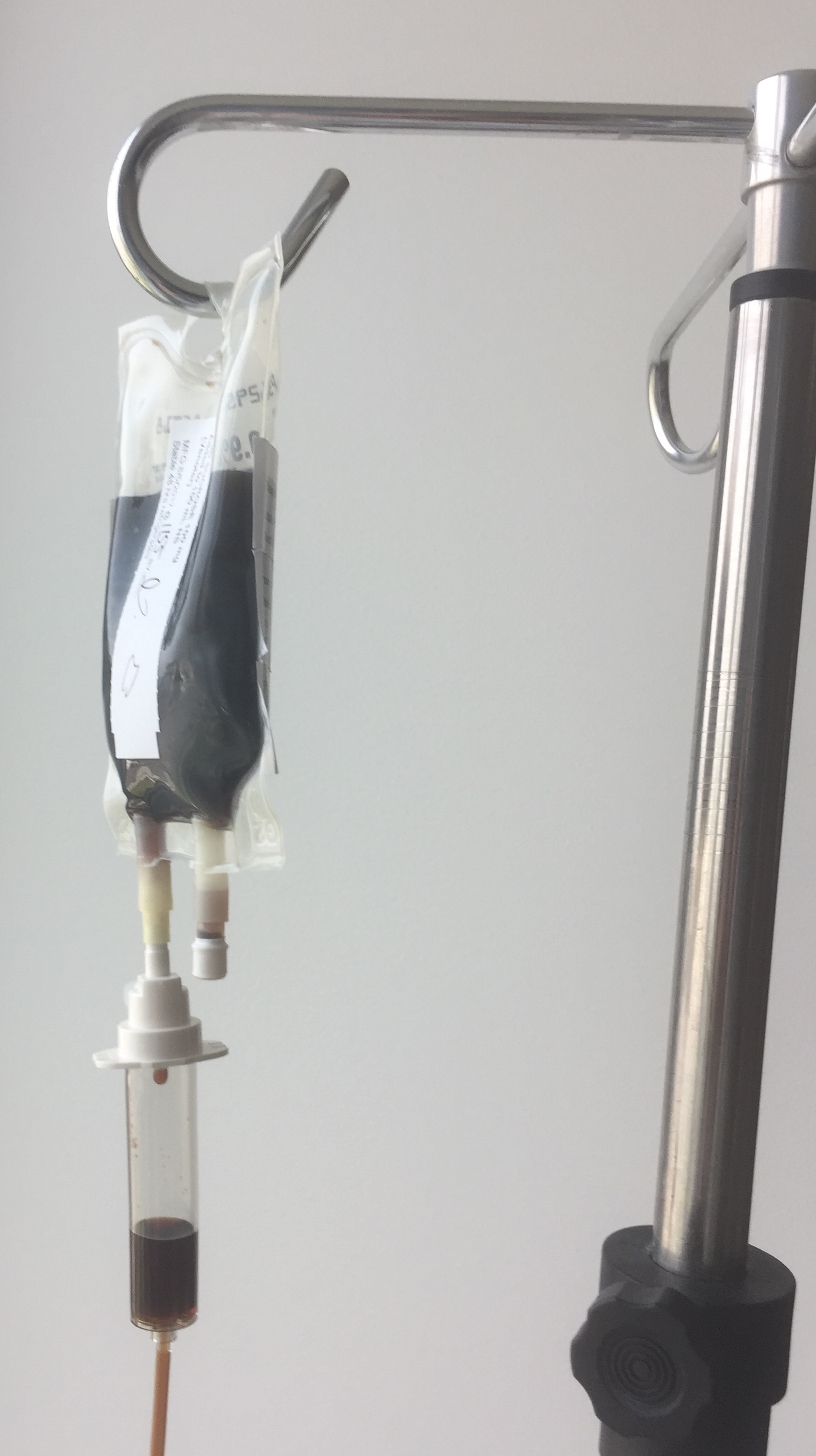

Clinical data
- Trade names: Venofer, others
- AHFS/Drugs.com: Monograph
- MedlinePlus: a614017
- License data: US DailyMed: Iron sucrose
- Pregnancy category: AU: B3
- Routes of administration: Intravenous
- ATC code: B03AB02 (WHO)

Legal status
- Legal status: US: ℞-only

Identifiers
- IUPAC name: disodium;(2R,3R,4S,5S,6R)-2-[(2S,3S,4S,5R)-3,4-dihydroxy-2,5-bis(hydroxymethyl)oxolan-2-yl]oxy-6-(hydroxymethyl)oxane-3,4,5-triol;iron(3+);oxygen(2-);hydroxide;trihydrate
- CAS Number: 8047-67-4
- PubChem CID: 91663255
- DrugBank: DB09146
- UNII: FZ7NYF5N8L
- KEGG: D04616; C19519
- ChEBI: CHEBI:82530
- ChEMBL: ChEMBL1200823

Chemical and physical data
- Formula: C_{12}H_{29}Fe_{5}Na_{2}O_{23}
- Molar mass: 866.546 g·mol^{−1}
- 3D model (JSmol): Interactive image
- SMILES: C(C1C(C(C(C(O1)OC2(C(C(C(O2)CO)O)O)CO)O)O)O)O.O.O.O.[OH-].[O-2].[O-2].[O-2].[O-2].[O-2].[O-2].[O-2].[O-2].[Na+].[Na+].[Fe+3].[Fe+3].[Fe+3].[Fe+3].[Fe+3]
- InChI: InChI=1S/C12H22O11.5Fe.2Na.4H2O.8O/c13-1-4-6(16)8(18)9(19)11(21-4)23-12(3-15)10(20)7(17)5(2-14)22-12;;;;;;;;;;;;;;;;;;;/h4-11,13-20H,1-3H2;;;;;;;;4*1H2;;;;;;;;/q;5*+3;2*+1;;;;;8*-2/p-1/t4-,5-,6-,7-,8+,9-,10+,11-,12+;;;;;;;;;;;;;;;;;;;/m1.................../s1; Key:FWZTTZUKDVJDCM-CEJAUHOTSA-M

Intravenous iron sucrose, sold under the brand name Venofer is a treatment used for iron-deficiency anemia. Iron sucrose replaces iron in the blood to foster red blood cell production in patients with chronic kidney disease.

Iron sucrose is available as a generic medication.

== Medical uses ==
Iron sucrose is a dark brown liquid solution. It is administered intravenously and is only used when a patient with iron deficiency cannot be treated using oral iron options. It is a generally effective drug, with more than 80% of patients responding to treatment. Iron sucrose has ~20 mg of iron per mL of solution. A typical adult patient can safely receive 600 mg of iron sucrose per week, administered in separate doses of 200–300 mg. Most patients experience an increase in their hemoglobin levels of at least 20 g/L. Administration usually takes from fifteen to thirty minutes and is done by a medical professional. Often, normal saline solution (NSS) is mixed with the iron sucrose during injection.

Once iron sucrose has been administered, it is transferred to ferritin, the normal iron storage protein. Then, it is broken down in the liver, spleen, and bone marrow. The iron is then either stored for later use in the body or taken up by plasma. The plasma transfers the iron to hemoglobin, where it can begin increasing erythropoiesis (red blood cell production).

Iron sucrose is most commonly used to treat iron deficiency anemia, which can be caused by chronic kidney disease.

== Side effects ==
Iron sucrose can have a multitude of unintended side effects during and after administration. The following symptoms are considered serious, and a patient experiencing them should seek immediate medical attention:

- headache
- blurry vision
- lasting dizziness or faintness
- fever
- chest pain or tightness
- difficulty breathing
- unusual heartbeat
- unusual tingling
- sudden weight change
- swelling and bloating

Less serious symptoms, which only need to be addressed by a medical professional if they are long-lasting, include:

- sweetly-scented breath
- difficulty tasting
- nausea
- eye pain, irritation, or swelling
- diarrhea
- pain at the injection site
- body cramping, aching, pain, or weakness
- issues moving
- chills

Dizziness and fainting during treatment is not uncommon and can be addressed during treatment by a medical professional. These symptoms are also common when the dose the patient receives is raised.

Iron sucrose has also been shown to significantly lower the risk of gastrointestinal problems when compared to oral iron treatments. It has a much lower rate of serious allergic reactions in comparison to other iron substitution treatments (around 0.002% in iron sucrose in comparison to 0.04–2.3% in other treatments). In iron sucrose, there have been no reported cases of these reactions being deadly.

== Chemical structure ==
The chemical formula of iron sucrose is C_{12}H_{29}Fe_{5}Na_{2}O_{23}. The iron sucrose molecule is a polymer with two main molecules; sucrose (chemical formula C_{12}H_{22}O_{11}) and an iron (III) hydroxide (Na_{2}Fe_{5}O_{8}•3(H_{2}O)). These two components are in solution together, but are not bound to one another. Iron sucrose is a type II complex, with two oxygen atoms bonded to each iron atom. When used for medicinal purposes, the iron complex is polymerized and the sucrose molecules combined to form a larger polysaccharide. The number of polymerizations does not have to be the same as the number of sucrose molecules in the polysaccharide.

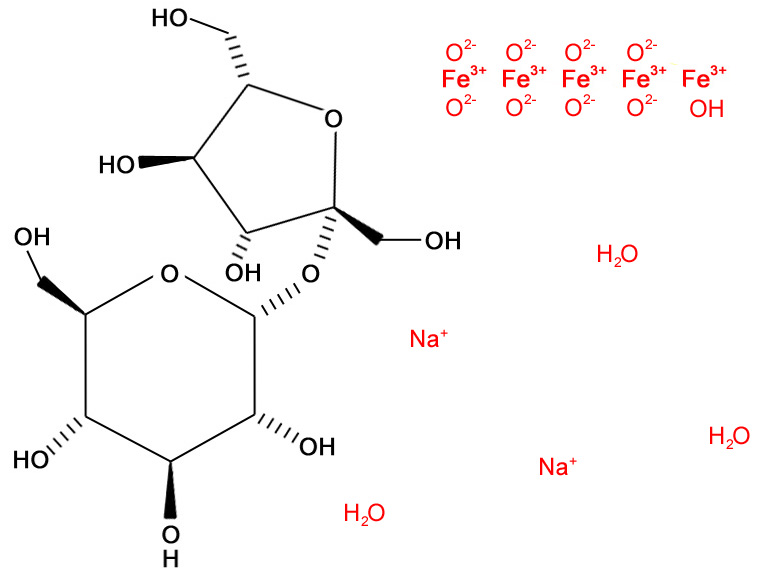
Structure of iron sucrose. Sucrose molecule is black, and iron complex and ions in solution are red.

== History ==
Iron sucrose's first known use was in Europe in 1949, but it was not used in US medicine until November 2000. It replaced iron dextran, which had been in use in the US since the 1900s, as a treatment for iron deficiency. Iron dextran was only used for extremely high risk situations, because it released enough iron at once to be toxic to the body. Further development of iron dextran was able to lower these reactions, but also caused more severe gastrointestinal problems. These compounds caused issues mostly because of their high molecular weights. Low-molecular-weight alternatives were eventually introduced to counter these risks. The first of these was sodium ferric gluconate complex in 1999, which lowered the risk of unwanted gastrointestinal issues. Iron sucrose followed shortly after, and had an even greater effect on reducing the frequency of serious adverse side effects.
