= Iron-deficiency anemia =

Reduced ability of the blood to carry oxygen due to a lack of iron

- Other names: Iron-deficiency anaemia, FeDA, Sideropenic Anemia
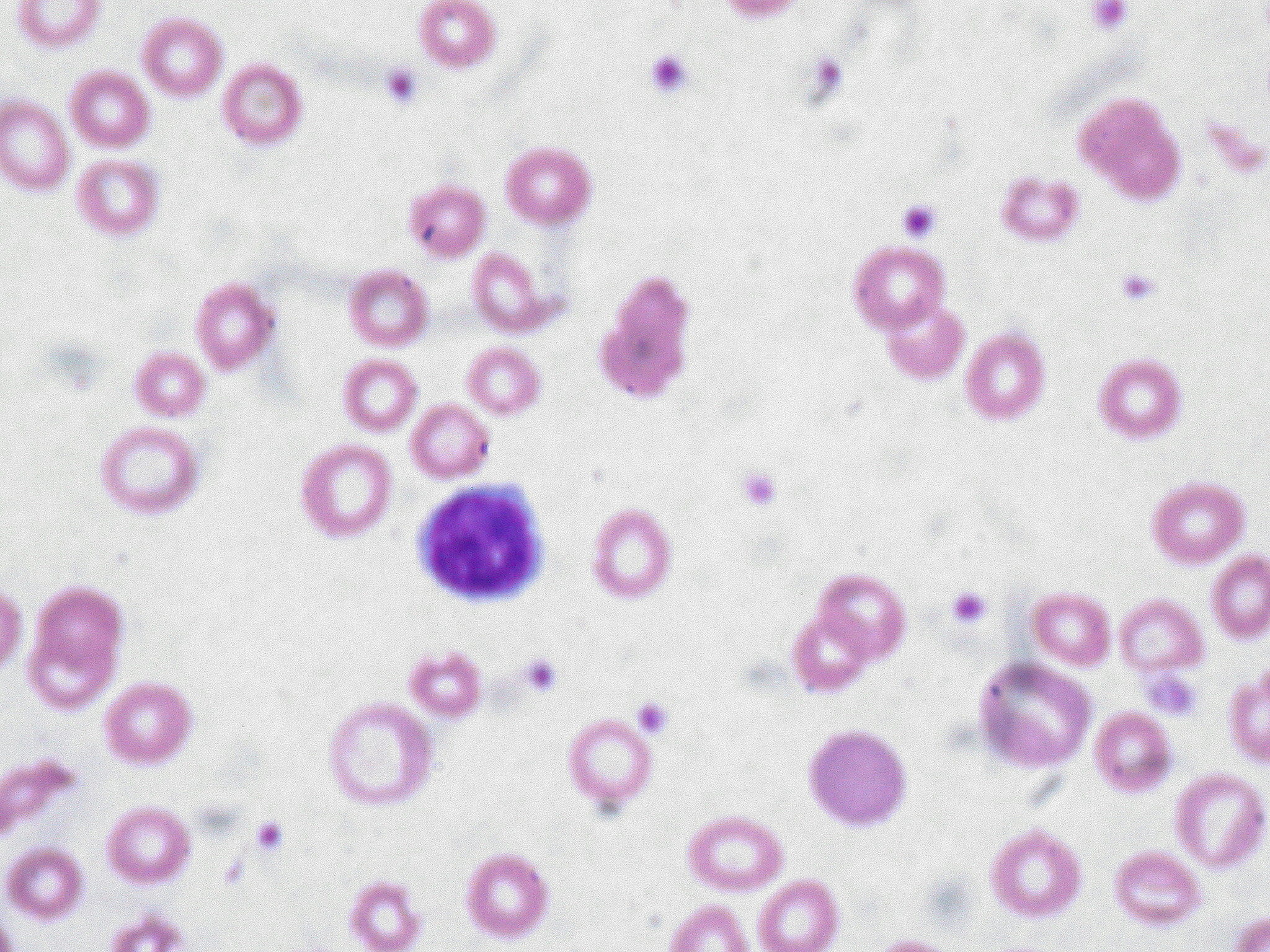
- A peripheral blood smear depicting iron-deficiency anemia
- Specialty: Hematology
- Symptoms: Feeling tired, weakness, shortness of breath, confusion, pallor
- Complications: Heart failure, arrhythmias, frequent infections
- Causes: Iron deficiency
- Diagnostic method: Blood tests
- Treatment: Dietary changes, medications, surgery
- Medication: Iron supplements, vitamin C, blood transfusions
- Frequency: 1.48 billion (2015)
- Deaths: 54,200 (2015)

Iron-deficiency anemia is anemia caused by a lack of iron. Anemia is defined as a decrease in the number of red blood cells or the amount of hemoglobin in the blood. When onset is slow, symptoms are often vague, such as feeling tired, weak, short of breath, or having decreased ability to exercise. Anemia that comes on quickly often has more severe symptoms, including confusion, feeling like one is going to pass out or increased thirst. Anemia is typically significant before a person becomes noticeably pale. Children with iron deficiency anemia may have problems with growth and development. There may be additional symptoms depending on the underlying cause.

Iron-deficiency anemia is caused by blood loss, insufficient dietary intake, or poor absorption of iron from food. Sources of blood loss can include heavy periods, childbirth, uterine fibroids, stomach ulcers, colon cancer, and urinary tract bleeding. Poor absorption of iron from food may occur as a result of an intestinal disorder such as inflammatory bowel disease or celiac disease, or surgery such as a gastric bypass. In the developing world, parasitic worms, malaria, and HIV/AIDS increase the risk of iron deficiency anemia. Diagnosis is confirmed by blood tests.

Iron deficiency anemia can be prevented by eating a diet containing sufficient amounts of iron or by iron supplementation. Foods high in iron include meat, nuts, and foods made with iron-fortified flour. Treatment may include dietary changes, iron supplements, and dealing with underlying causes, for example, medical treatment for parasites or surgery for ulcers. Supplementation with vitamin C may be recommended due to its potential to aid iron absorption. Severe cases may be treated with blood transfusions or iron infusions.

Iron-deficiency anemia affected about 1.48 billion people in 2015. A lack of dietary iron is estimated to cause approximately half of all anemia cases globally. Women and young children are most commonly affected. In 2015, anemia due to iron deficiency resulted in about 54,000 deaths – down from 213,000 deaths in 1990.

== Signs and symptoms ==
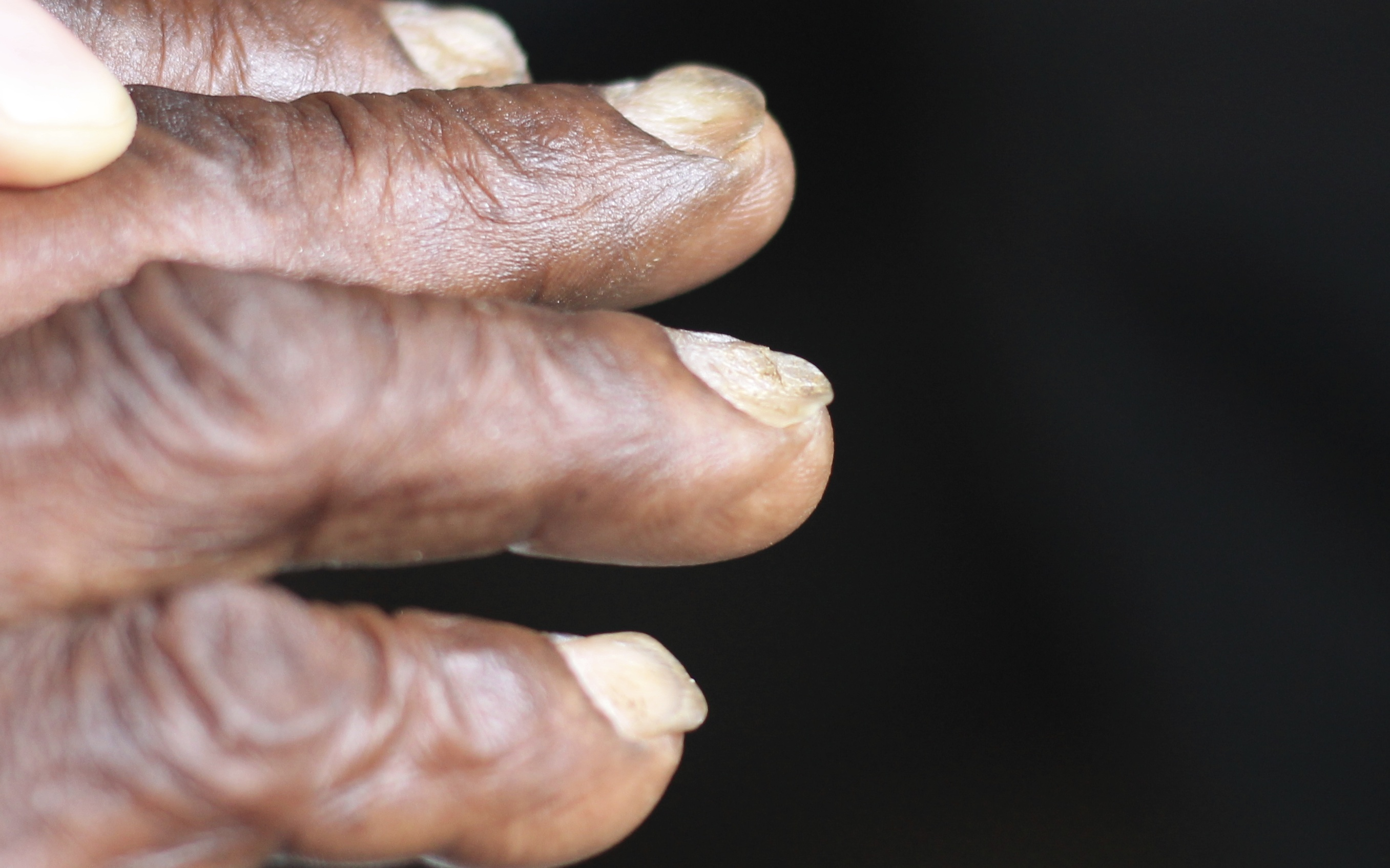
Koilonychia (spoon-shaped nails)

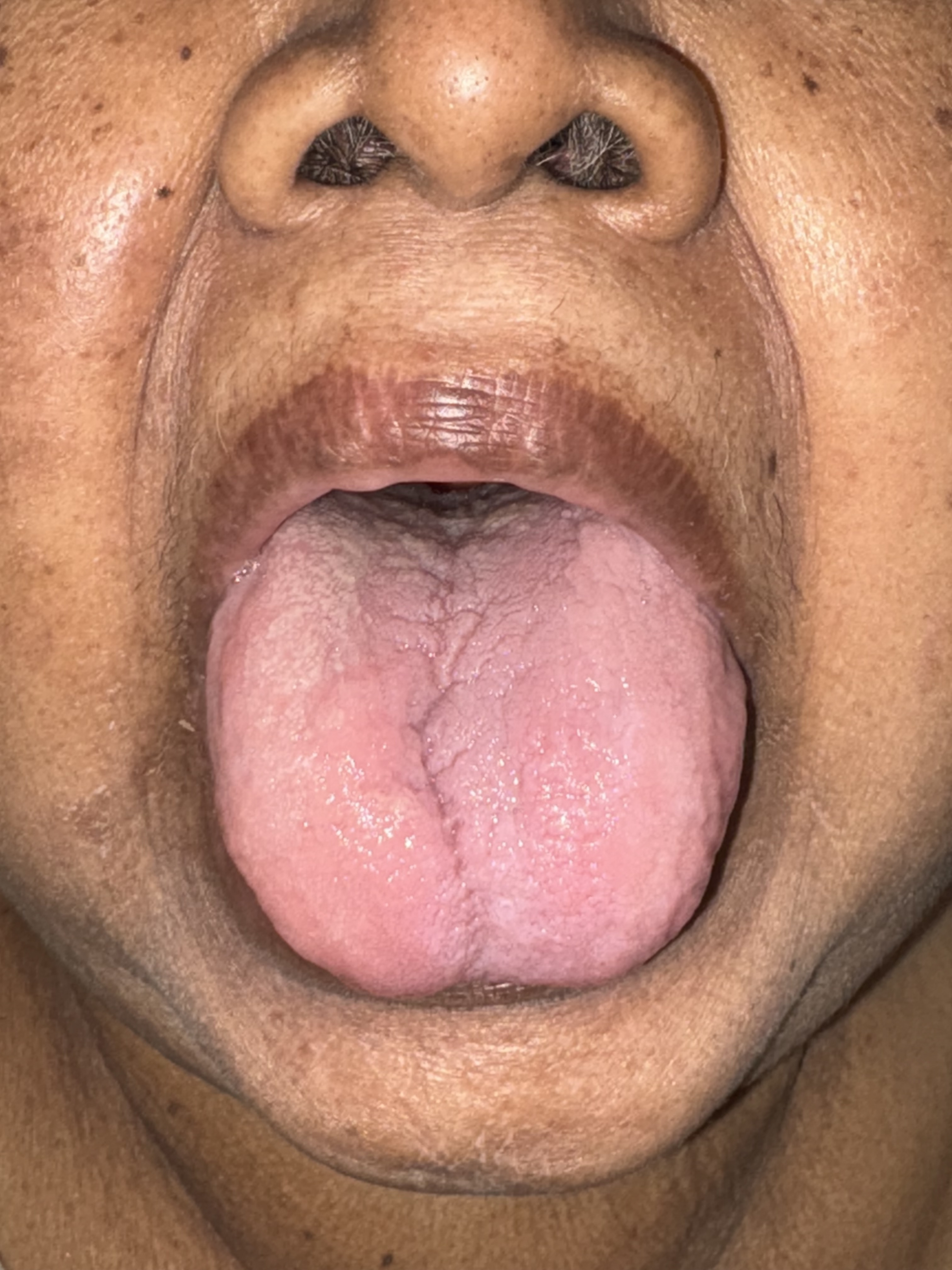
A case of glossitis due to iron-deficiency anemia in a Thai female adult

People with mild or moderate iron-deficiency anemia may not have any symptoms. It tends to develop slowly; therefore, the body has time to adapt, and the disease often goes unrecognized for some time. More serious iron-deficiency anemia may cause common symptoms of anemia, such as feeling tired, shortness of breath, headaches, or chest pain.

Other symptoms include:

- dizziness or lightheadedness
- weakness
- pale skin
- palpitations (feeling that the heart is skipping beats or fluttering)
- cold intolerance
- cold hands and feet

Other possible symptoms and signs of iron-deficiency anemia include, decreased ability to concentrate, irritability, numbness or burning sensations, glossitis, angular cheilitis, koilonychia (spoon-shaped nails) or brittle nails, poor appetite, difficulty swallowing, periorbital hyperpigmentation (may related to the iron-deficiency induced worse blood oxygenation and vitamin B_{12}), and restless legs syndrome. Pica may also develop; of which consumption of ice, known as pagophagia, has been suggested to be the most specific for iron deficiency anemia. None of these symptoms (or any of the others above) are sensitive or specific.

=== Child development ===
Iron-deficiency anemia is associated with poor neurological development, including decreased learning ability and altered motor functions. This is because iron deficiency impacts the development of the cells of the brain called neurons. When the body is low on iron, the red blood cells get priority on iron, and it is shifted away from the neurons of the brain. Exact causation has not been established, but there is a possible long-term impact from these neurological issues.

== Cause ==
A diagnosis of iron-deficiency anemia requires further investigation into its cause. It can be caused by increased iron demand, increased iron loss, or decreased iron intake. Increased iron demand often occurs during periods of growth, such as in children and pregnant women. For example, during stages of rapid growth, babies and adolescents may outpace their dietary intake of iron, which can result in deficiency in the absence of disease or a grossly abnormal diet. Iron loss is typically from blood loss. One example of blood loss is by chronic gastrointestinal blood loss, which could be linked to a possible cancer. In people who have periods, heavy menstrual periods can be a source of blood loss, causing iron-deficiency anemia. People who do not consume much iron in their diet, such as vegans or vegetarians, are also at increased risk of developing iron deficiency anemia.

=== Parasitic disease ===
The leading cause of iron-deficiency anemia worldwide is a parasitic disease known as a helminthiasis caused by infestation with parasitic worms (helminths); specifically, hookworms. The hookworms most commonly responsible for causing iron-deficiency anemia include Ancylostoma duodenale, Ancylostoma ceylanicum, and Necator americanus. The World Health Organization estimates that approximately two billion people are infected with soil-transmitted helminths worldwide. Parasitic worms cause both inflammation and chronic blood loss by binding to a human's small-intestinal mucosa, and through their means of feeding and degradation, they can ultimately cause iron-deficiency anemia.

=== Blood loss ===
Red blood cells contain iron, so blood loss also leads to iron loss. There are several causes of blood loss, including menstrual bleeding, gastrointestinal bleeding, stomach ulcers, and bleeding disorders. The bleeding may occur quickly or slowly. Slow, chronic blood loss within the body – such as from a peptic ulcer, angiodysplasia, inflammatory bowel disease, a colon polyp or gastrointestinal cancer (e.g., colon cancer) – can cause iron-deficiency anemia.

==== Menstrual bleeding ====
Menstrual bleeding is a common cause of iron deficiency anemia in people who are capable of having periods. People with menorrhagia (heavy menstrual periods) are at risk of iron deficiency anemia because they are at a higher than normal risk of losing more iron during menstruation than is replaced in their diet. Most women lose about 40 mL of blood per cycle. Some birth control methods, such as pills and IUDs, may decrease the amount of blood and therefore iron lost during a menstrual cycle. Intermittent iron supplementation may be as effective a treatment in these cases as daily supplements and reduce some of the adverse effects of long-term daily supplements.

==== Gastrointestinal bleeding ====
The most common cause of iron deficiency anemia in men and post-menopausal women is gastrointestinal bleeding. There are many sources of gastrointestinal tract bleeding, including the stomach, esophagus, small intestine, and the large intestine (colon). Gastrointestinal bleeding can result from regular use of some medications, such as non-steroidal anti-inflammatory drugs (e.g. aspirin), as well as antiplatelets such as clopidogrel and anticoagulants such as warfarin; however, these are required in some patients, especially those with states causing a tendency to form blood clots. Colon cancer, which typically occurs in older individuals, is another potential cause of gastrointestinal bleeding. In addition, some bleeding disorders, such as von Willebrand disease and polycythemia vera, can cause gastrointestinal bleeding.

==== Blood donation ====
Frequent blood donors are also at risk for developing iron deficiency anemia. When whole blood is donated, approximately 200 mg of iron is lost from the body. The blood bank screens people for anemia before drawing blood for donation. If the patient has anemia, blood is not drawn. Less iron is lost if the person is donating platelets or white blood cells.

=== Diet ===
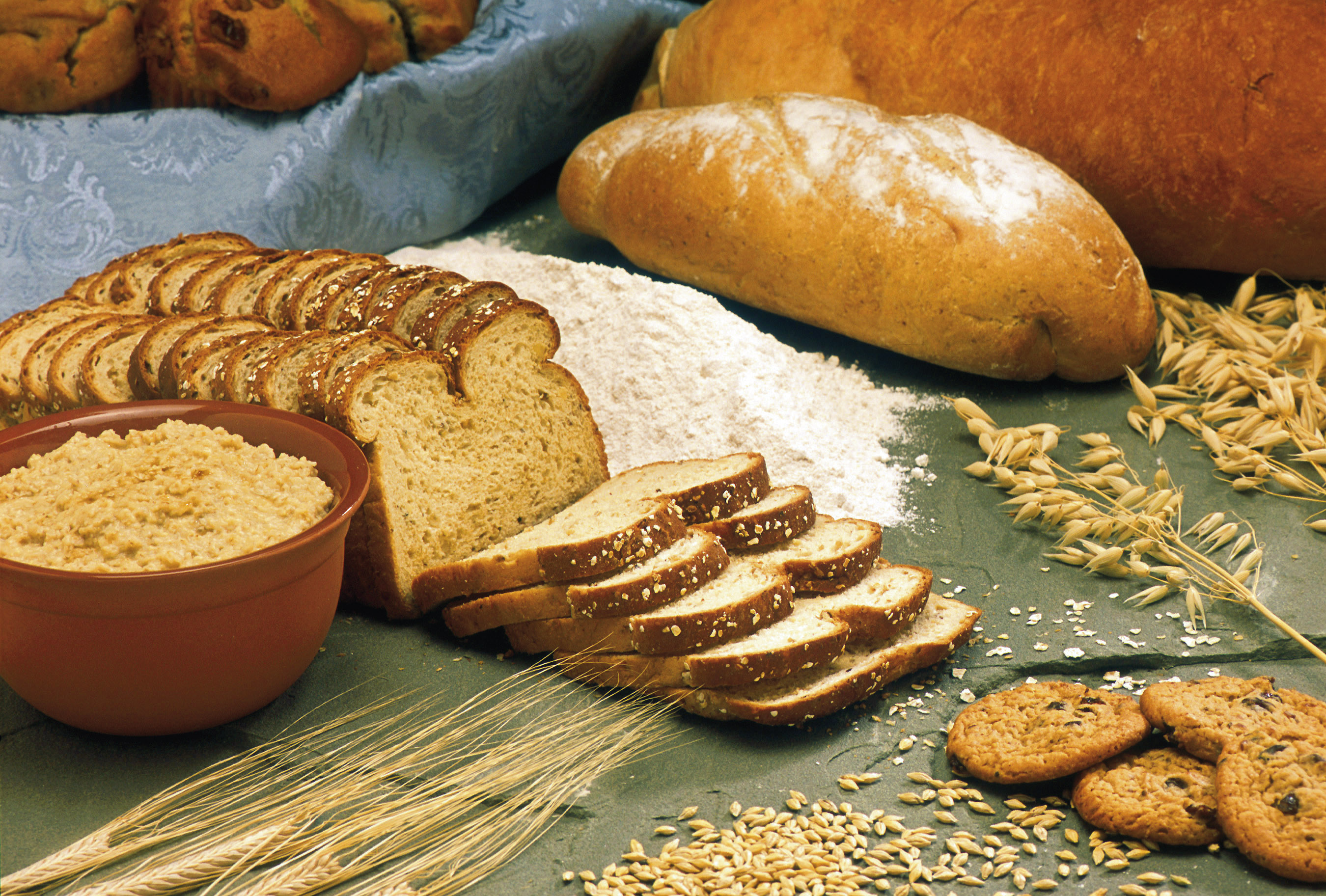
In many countries, wheat flour is fortified with iron.

The body normally gets the iron it requires from food. If a person consumes too little iron, or iron that is poorly absorbed (non-heme iron), they can become iron-deficient over time. Examples of iron-rich foods include meat, eggs, leafy green vegetables and iron-fortified foods. For proper growth and development, infants and children need dietary iron. For children, a high intake of cow's milk is associated with an increased risk of iron-deficiency anemia. Other risk factors (at least in toddlers) include low meat intake and low intake of iron-fortified products.

The National Academy of Medicine updated Estimated Average Requirements (EAR) and Recommended Dietary Allowances (RDA) in 2001. The current EAR for iron for women ages 14–18 is 7.9 mg/day, 8.1 for ages 19–50, and 5.0 thereafter (post menopause). For men, the EAR is 6.0 mg/day for ages 19 and up. The RDA is 15.0 mg/day for women ages 15–18, 18.0 for 19–50, and 8.0 thereafter; for men, 8.0 mg/day for ages 19 and up. (Recommended Dietary Allowances are higher than Estimated Average Requirements so as to cover people with higher than average requirements.) The RDA for pregnancy is 27 mg/day, and during lactation, 9 mg/day. For children ages 1–3 years, it is 7 mg/day, 10 for ages 4–8, and 8 for ages 9–13. The European Food Safety Authority refers to the collective set of information as Dietary Reference Values, with Population Reference Intakes instead of RDAs, and Average Requirements instead of EARs. For women, the Population Reference Intake is 13 mg/day for ages 15–17 years, 16 mg/day for women ages 18 and up who are premenopausal, and 11 mg/day postmenopausal; for pregnancy and lactation, 16 mg/day. For men, the Population Reference Intake is 11 mg/day for ages 15 and older. For children ages 1 to 14, the Population Reference Intake increases from 7 to 11 mg/day. The Population Reference Intakes are higher than the US RDAs, with the exception of pregnancy.

=== Iron malabsorption ===
Iron from food is absorbed into the bloodstream in the small intestine, primarily in the duodenum. Iron malabsorption is a less common cause of iron-deficiency anemia, but many gastrointestinal disorders can reduce the body's ability to absorb iron. Different mechanisms may be present.

In celiac disease, abnormal structural changes in the duodenum can decrease iron absorption. Abnormalities or surgical removal of the stomach can also lead to malabsorption by altering the acidic environment needed for iron to be converted into its absorbable form. If there is insufficient production of hydrochloric acid in the stomach, hypochlorhydria/achlorhydria can occur (often due to chronic H. pylori infections or long-term proton-pump inhibitor therapy), inhibiting the conversion of ferric iron to the absorbable ferrous iron.

Bariatric surgery is associated with an increased risk of iron deficiency anemia due to malabsorption of iron. During a Roux-en-Y anastamosis, which is commonly performed for weight management and diabetes control, the stomach is made into a small pouch and this is connected directly to the small intestines further downstream (bypassing the duodenum as a site of digestion). About 17–45% of people develop iron deficiency after a Roux-en-Y gastric bypass.

=== Pregnant people ===
Without iron supplementation, iron-deficiency anemia occurs in many pregnant people because their iron stores need to serve their own increased blood volume and be a source of hemoglobin for the growing baby and placental development. Other less common causes are intravascular hemolysis and hemoglobinuria. Iron deficiency in pregnancy appears to cause long-term and irreversible cognitive problems in the baby.

Iron deficiency affects maternal well-being by increasing the risk of infections and complications during pregnancy. Some of these complications include pre-eclampsia, bleeding problems, and perinatal infections. Iron deficiency can lead to improper development of fetal tissues. Oral iron supplementation during the early stages of pregnancy, specifically the first trimester, is suggested to decrease the adverse effects of iron-deficiency anemia throughout pregnancy and to decrease the negative impact that iron deficiency has on fetal growth. Iron supplements may lead to a risk for gestational diabetes, so pregnant women with adequate hemoglobin levels are recommended not to take iron supplements. Iron deficiency can lead to premature labor and to problems with neural functioning, including delays in language and motor development in the infant.

Some studies show that people pregnant during their teenage years can be at greater risk of iron-deficiency anemia due to an already increased need for iron and other nutrients during adolescent growth spurts.

=== Children ===
Babies are at increased risk of developing iron deficiency anemia due to their rapid growth. Their need for iron is greater than they are getting in their diet. Babies are born with iron stores; however, these iron stores typically run out by 4–6 months of age. In addition, infants who are given cow's milk too early can develop anemia due to gastrointestinal blood loss.

Children who are at risk for iron-deficiency anemia include:

- Preterm infants
- Low birth weight infants
- Infants fed with cow's milk under 12 months of age
- Breastfed infants who have not received iron supplementation after age 6 months, or those receiving non-iron-fortified formulas
- Children between the ages of 1 and 5 years old who receive more than 24 ounces (700 mL) of cow milk per day
- Children with low socioeconomic status
- Children with special health care needs
- Children of Hispanic ethnicity
- Children who are overweight

=== Hepcidin ===
Decreased serum and urine hepcidin levels are early indicators of iron deficiency. Hepcidin concentrations are also connected to the complex relationship between malaria and iron deficiency.

== Mechanism ==
Anemia can result from significant iron deficiency. When the body has sufficient iron to meet its needs (functional iron), the remainder is stored for later use in cells, mostly in the bone marrow and liver. These stores are called ferritin complexes and are part of the human (and other animals) iron metabolism systems. Men store about 3.5 g of iron in their bodies, and women store about 2.5 g.

Hepcidin is a peptide hormone produced in the liver that is responsible for regulating iron levels in the body. Hepcidin decreases the amount of iron available for erythropoiesis (red blood cell production). Hepcidin binds to and induces the degradation of ferroportin, which is responsible for exporting iron from cells and mobilizing it to the bloodstream. Conditions such as high levels of erythropoesis, iron deficiency and tissue hypoxia inhibit hepcidin expression. Whereas systemic infection or inflammation (especially involving the cytokine IL-6) or increased circulating iron levels stimulate hepcidin expression.

Iron is a mineral that is important in the formation of red blood cells in the body, particularly as a critical component of hemoglobin. About 70% of the iron found in the body is bound to hemoglobin. Iron is primarily absorbed in the small intestine, in particular the duodenum and jejunum. Certain factors increase or decrease iron absorption. For example, taking Vitamin C with a source of iron is known to increase absorption. Some medications such as tetracyclines and antacids can decrease absorption of iron. After being absorbed in the small intestine, iron travels through blood, bound to transferrin, and eventually ends up in the bone marrow, where it is involved in red blood cell formation. When red blood cells are degraded, the iron is recycled by the body and stored.

When the amount of iron needed by the body exceeds the amount of iron that is readily available, the body can use iron stores (ferritin) for a period of time, and red blood cell formation continues normally. However, as these stores continue to be used, iron is eventually depleted to the point that red blood cell formation is abnormal. Ultimately, anemia ensues, which by definition is a hemoglobin lab value below normal limits.

== Diagnosis ==
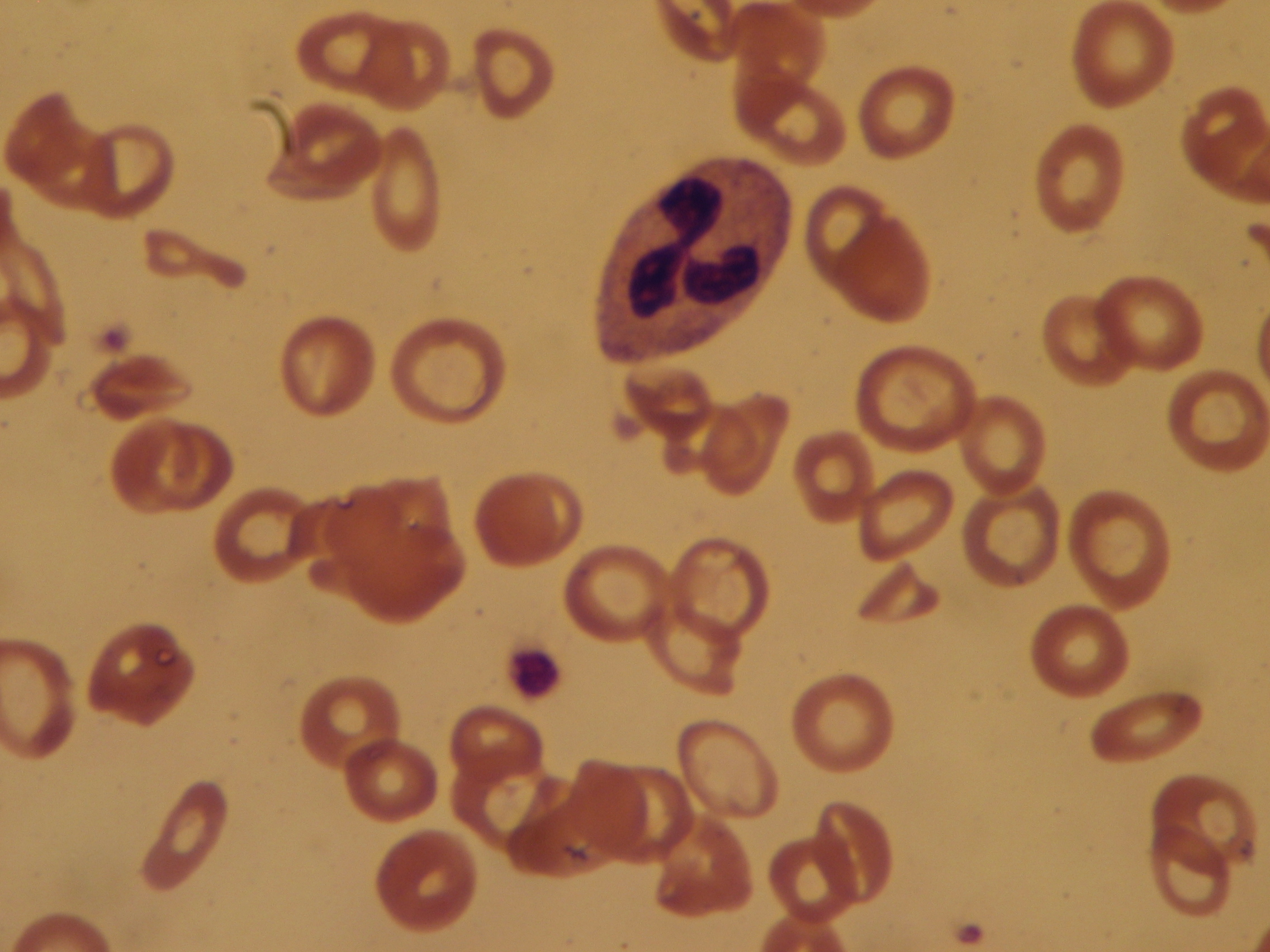
Blood smear of a person with iron-deficiency anemia at 40X enhancement

Conventionally, a definitive diagnosis requires a demonstration of depleted body iron stores obtained by bone marrow aspiration, with the marrow stained for iron. However, with the availability of reliable blood tests that can be more readily collected for iron-deficiency anemia diagnosis, a bone marrow aspiration is usually not obtained. Furthermore, a study published in April 2009 questions the value of stainable bone marrow iron following parenteral iron therapy. Once iron deficiency anemia is confirmed, gastrointestinal blood loss is presumed to be the cause until proven otherwise since it can be caused by an otherwise asymptomatic colon cancer. The initial evaluation must include esophagogastroduodenoscopy and colonoscopy to evaluate for cancer or bleeding of the gastrointestinal tract.

A thorough medical history is important to diagnose iron-deficiency anemia. The history can help to differentiate common causes of the condition, such as menstruation in women or blood in the stool. A travel history to areas in which hookworms and whipworms are endemic may also help guide certain stool tests for parasites or their eggs. Although symptoms can play a role in identifying iron-deficiency anemia, they are often vague, which may limit their contribution to determining the diagnosis.

=== Blood tests ===
Change in lab values in iron deficiency anemia
| Change | Parameter |
|---|---|
| ↓ | ferritin, hemoglobin, mean corpuscular volume, mean corpuscular hemoglobin |
| ↑ | total iron-binding capacity, transferrin, red blood cell distribution width |

Routine blood tests often discover anemia. A sufficiently low hemoglobin by definition makes the diagnosis of anemia, and a low hematocrit value is also characteristic of anemia. Further studies will be undertaken to determine the cause of anemia. If the anemia is due to iron deficiency, one of the first abnormal values to be noted on a complete blood count, as the body's iron stores begin to be depleted, will be a high red blood cell distribution width, reflecting an increased variability in the size of red blood cells.

A low mean corpuscular volume also appears during the course of body iron depletion. It indicates a high number of abnormally small red blood cells. A low mean corpuscular volume, a low mean corpuscular hemoglobin or mean corpuscular hemoglobin concentration, and the corresponding appearance of red blood cells on visual examination of a peripheral blood smear narrows the problem to a microcytic anemia (literally, a small red blood cell anemia).

The blood smear of a person with iron-deficiency anemia shows many hypochromic (pale, relatively colorless) and small red blood cells. It may also show poikilocytosis (variation in shape) and anisocytosis (variation in size). With more severe iron-deficiency anemia, the peripheral blood smear may show hypochromic, pencil-shaped cells and, occasionally, small numbers of nucleated red blood cells. The platelet count may be slightly above the high limit of normal in iron-deficiency anemia (termed a mild thrombocytosis), but severe cases can present with thrombocytopenia (low platelet count).

Iron-deficiency anemia is confirmed by tests that include serum ferritin, serum iron level, serum transferrin, and total iron binding capacity. A low serum ferritin is most commonly found. However, serum ferritin can be elevated by any chronic inflammation and thus is not consistently decreased in iron-deficiency anemia. Serum iron levels may be measured, but serum iron concentration is not as reliable as the measurement of both serum iron and serum iron-binding protein levels. The percentage of iron saturation (or transferrin saturation index or percent) can be measured by dividing the level of serum iron by total iron binding capacity and is a value that can help to confirm the diagnosis of iron-deficiency anemia; however, other conditions must also be considered, including other types of anemia.

Another finding that can be used is the level of red blood cell distribution width. During haemoglobin synthesis, trace amounts of zinc will be incorporated into protoporphyrin in the place of iron which is lacking. Protoporphyrin can be separated from its zinc moiety and measured as free erythrocyte protoporphyrin, providing an indirect measurement of the zinc-protoporphyrin complex. The level of free erythrocyte protoporphyrin is expressed in either μg/dl of whole blood or μg/dl of red blood cells. An iron insufficiency in the bone marrow can be detected very early by a rise in free erythrocyte protoporphyrin.

Further testing may be necessary to differentiate iron-deficiency anemia from other disorders, such as thalassemia minor. It is very important not to treat people with thalassemia with an iron supplement, as this can lead to hemochromatosis. A hemoglobin electrophoresis provides useful evidence for distinguishing these two conditions, along with iron studies.

=== Screening ===
It is unclear if screening pregnant women for iron-deficiency anemia during pregnancy improves outcomes in the United States. The same holds for screening children who are 6 to 24 months old. Even so, screening is a Level B recommendation suggested by the US Preventive Services Task Force in pregnant women without symptoms and in infants considered high risk. Screening is done with either a hemoglobin or hematocrit lab test.

== Treatment ==
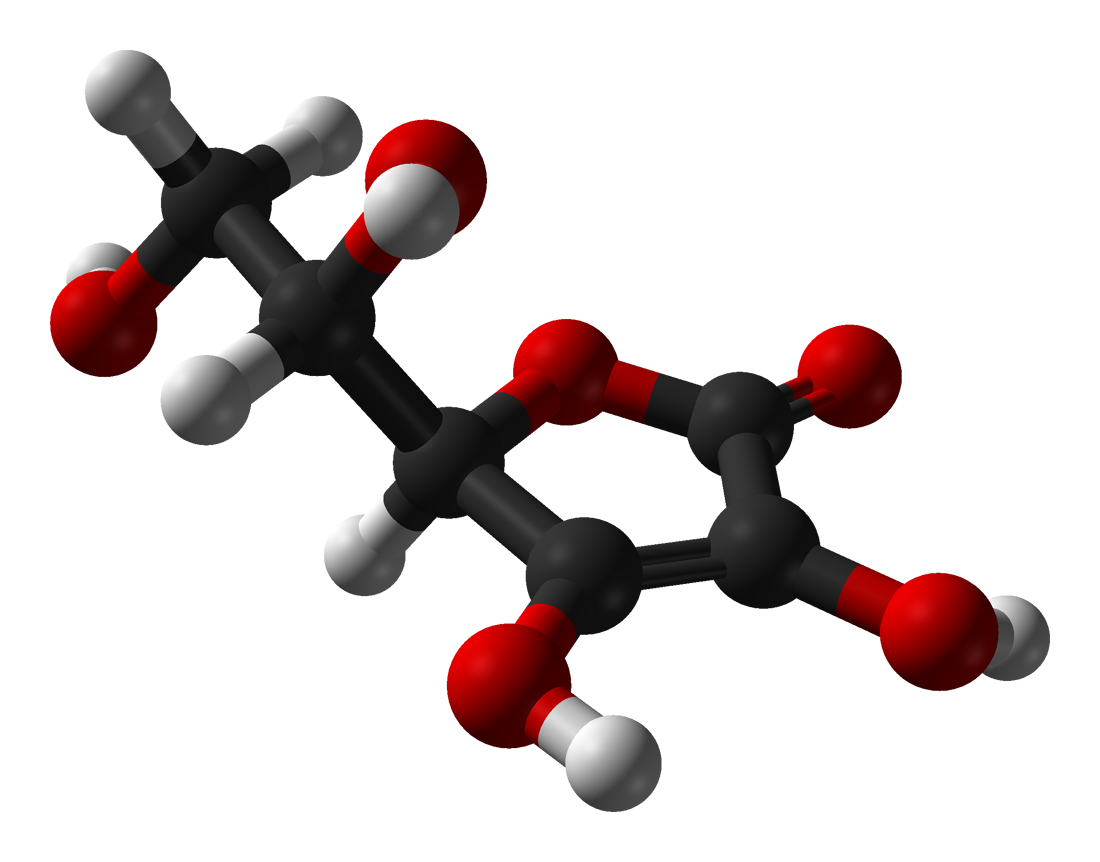
Ascorbic acid

Treatment should take into account the cause and severity of the condition. If the iron-deficiency anemia is a result of blood loss or another underlying cause, treatment is geared toward addressing the underlying cause. Most cases of iron deficiency anemia are treated with oral iron supplements. In severe acute cases, treatment measures are taken for immediate management in the interim, such as blood transfusions or intravenous iron.

For less severe cases, treatment of iron-deficiency anemia includes dietary changes to incorporate iron-rich foods into regular oral intake and oral iron supplementation. Foods rich in ascorbic acid (vitamin C) can also be beneficial, since ascorbic acid enhances iron absorption. Oral iron supplements are available in multiple forms. Some are in the form of pills, and some are drops for children.

Most forms of oral iron replacement therapy are absorbed well by the small intestine; however, there are certain preparations of iron supplements that are designed for longer release in the small intestine than other preparations. Oral iron supplements are best taken up by the body on an empty stomach because food can decrease the amount of iron absorbed from the small intestine. The dosing of oral iron replacement therapy is as much as 100–200 mg per day in adults and 3–6 mg per kilogram in children. This is generally spread out as 3–4 pills taken throughout the day.

The various forms of treatment are not without possible adverse side effects. Iron supplementation by mouth commonly causes negative gastrointestinal effects, including constipation, nausea, vomiting, metallic taste to the oral iron and dark colored stools. Constipation is reported by 15–20% of patients taking oral iron therapy. Preparations of iron therapy that take longer to be absorbed by the small intestine (extended release iron therapy) are less likely to cause constipation.

It can take six months to one year to get blood levels of iron up to a normal range and provide the body with iron stores. Oral iron replacement may not be effective in cases of iron deficiency due to malabsorption, such as celiac disease, inflammatory bowel disease, or H. pylori infection; these cases would require treatment of the underlying disease to increase oral absorption or intravenous iron replacement.

As iron-deficiency anemia becomes more severe, if the anemia does not respond to oral treatments or if the treated person does not tolerate oral iron supplementation, then other measures may become necessary. Two options are intravenous iron injections and blood transfusion. Intravenous can be for people who do not tolerate oral iron, who are unlikely to respond to oral iron, or who require iron on a long-term basis. For example, people receiving dialysis treatment who are also getting erythropoietin or another erythropoiesis-stimulating agent are given parenteral iron, which helps the body respond to the erythropoietin agents to produce red blood cells.

Intravenous iron can induce an allergic response that can be as serious as anaphylaxis, although different formulations have decreased the likelihood of this adverse effect. In certain cases, intravenous iron is both safer and more effective than the oral route. For patients with severe anemia, such as from blood loss, or who have severe symptoms such as cardiovascular instability, a blood transfusion may be considered.

Low-certainty evidence suggests that IBD-related anemia treatment with Intravenous (IV) iron infusion may be more effective than oral iron therapy, with fewer people needing to stop treatment early due to adverse effects. The type of iron preparation may be an important determinant of clinical benefit. Moderate-certainty evidence suggests response to treatment may be higher when IV ferric carboxymaltose, rather than IV iron sucrose preparation is used, despite very-low certainty evidence of increased adverse effects, including bleeding, in those receiving ferric carboxymaltose treatment.

Ferric maltol, marketed as Accrufer and Ferracru, is available in oral and IV preparations. When used as a treatment for IBD-related anemia, very low certainty evidence suggests a marked benefit with oral ferric maltol compared with placebo. However it was unclear whether the IV preparation was more effective than oral ferric maltol.

A Cochrane review of controlled trials comparing intravenous (IV) iron therapy with oral iron supplements in people with chronic kidney disease, found low-certainty evidence that people receiving IV-iron treatment were 1.71 times as likely to reach their target hemoglobin levels. Overall, hemoglobin was 0.71g/dl higher than those treated with oral iron supplements. Iron stores in the liver, estimated by serum ferritin, were also 224.84 μg/L higher in those receiving IV-iron. However, there was also low-certainty evidence that allergic reactions were more likely following IV-iron therapy. It was unclear whether the type of iron therapy administration affects the risk of death from any cause, including cardiovascular, or whether it may alter the number of people who may require a blood transfusion or dialysis.

Ferric derisomaltose (Monoferric) was approved in the United States in January 2020 for the treatment of iron deficiency anemia.

== Epidemiology ==
Deaths due to iron-deficiency anaemia per million persons in 2012: No data 0 1 2–3 4–5 6–8 9–12 13–19 20–30 31–74 75-381

Disability-adjusted life year for iron-deficiency anemia per 100,000 inhabitants in 2004: No data Less than 50 50–100 100–150 150–200 200–250 250–300 300–350 350–400 400–450 450–500 500–1000 More than 1000

A moderate degree of iron-deficiency anemia affects approximately 610 million people worldwide or 8.8% of the population. It is slightly more common in females (9.9%) than males (7.8%). Up to 15% of children ages 1–3 years have iron deficiency anemia. Mild iron deficiency anemia affects another 375 million. Iron deficiency affects up to 52% of pregnant women worldwide.

The prevalence of iron deficiency as a cause of anemia varies among countries; in the groups in which anemia is most common, including young children and a subset of non-pregnant women, iron deficiency accounts for a fraction of anemia cases in these groups (25% and 37%, respectively). Iron deficiency is common in pregnant women.

Within the United States, iron-deficiency anemia affects about 2% of adult males, 10.5% of White women, and 20% of African-American and Mexican-American women. A study in 2024 suggests that nearly 1 in 3 Americans may have undiagnosed iron deficiency, which can cause fatigue, brain fog, and concentration problems. The analysis of data from over 8,000 U.S. adults found that 14% had low iron levels, known as absolute iron deficiency; 15% had normal iron levels but their bodies couldn't effectively use the mineral, a condition called functional iron deficiency.

A map provides a country-by-country listing of what nutrients are fortified into specified foods. Some of the Sub-Saharan countries shown in the deaths from iron-deficiency anemia map from 2012 are, as of 2018, fortifying foods with iron.
