= Polycythemia vera =

Overproduction of red blood cells by the bone marrow

- Other names: Polycythaemia vera (PV, PCV), erythremia, primary polycythemia, Vaquez disease, Osler-Vaquez disease, polycythemia rubra vera
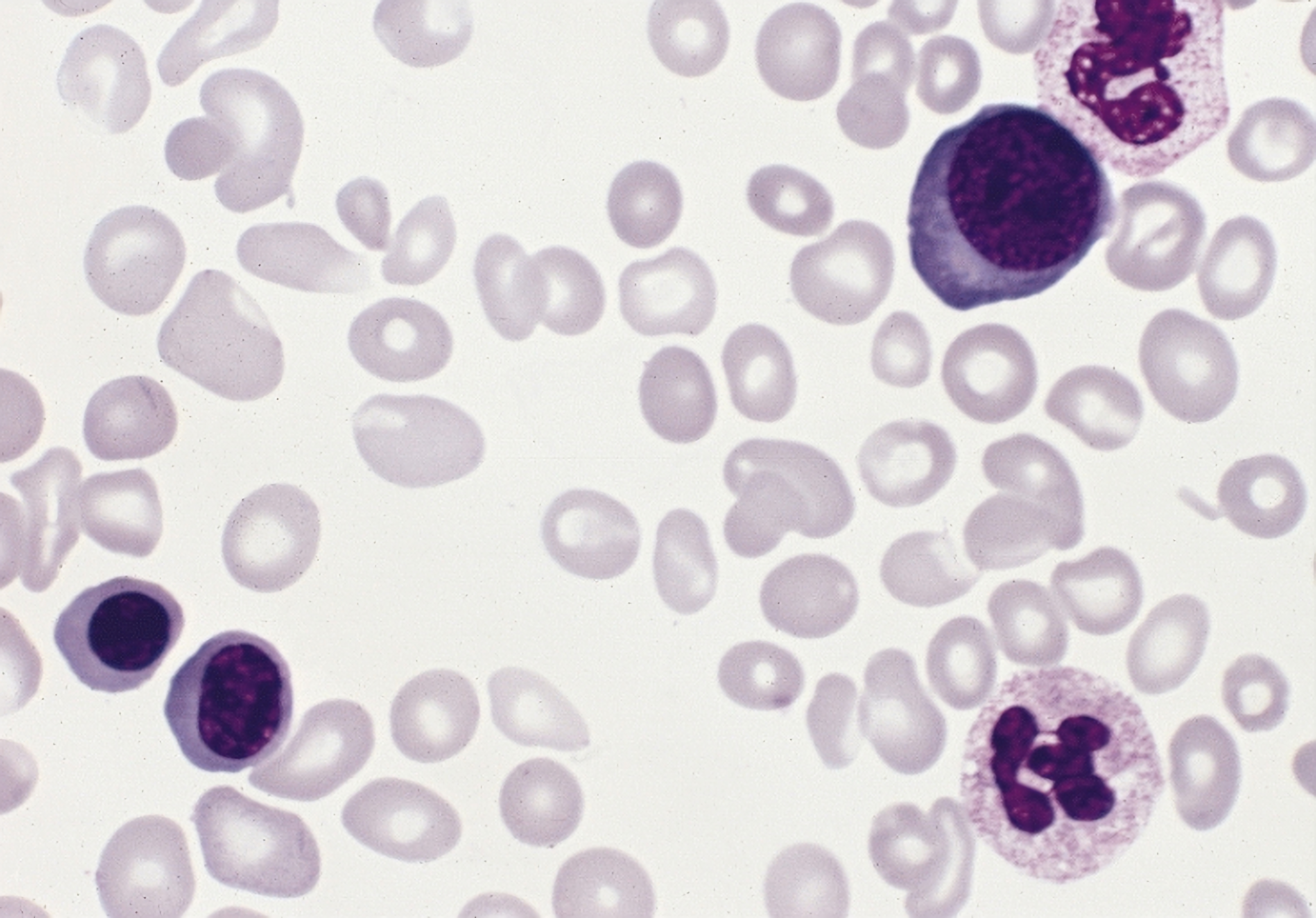
- Blood smear from a patient with polycythemia vera
- Specialty: Oncology, hematology

In oncology, polycythemia vera (PV) is an uncommon myeloproliferative neoplasm in which the bone marrow makes too many red blood cells. Approximately 98% of PV patients have a JAK2 gene mutation in their blood-forming cells (compared with 0.1-0.2% of the general population).

Most of the health concerns associated with PV, such as thrombosis, are caused by the blood being thicker as a result of the increased red blood cells.

PV may be asymptomatic. Possible symptoms, if any do occur, include fatigue, itching (pruritus), particularly after exposure to warm water, and severe burning pain in the hands or feet that is usually accompanied by a reddish or bluish coloration of the skin.

Treatment consists primarily of blood withdrawals (phlebotomy) and oral meds.

PV is more common in the elderly.

== Classification ==
PV is code 2A20.4 in the ICD-11. It is a myeloproliferative neoplasm (MPN). It is a primary form of polycythemia.

== Pathophysiology ==
Approximately 98% of PV patients have a mutation in a tyrosine kinase–encoding gene, JAK2, in their blood-forming cells (compared with 0.1–0.2% of the general population).

This acts in signaling pathways of the EPO receptor, making those cells proliferate independently from EPO. PV is associated with a low serum level of the hormone erythropoietin (EPO), in contrast to secondary polycythemias.

While the mutation is a JAK2 V617F in 95% of patients, JAK2 exon 12 mutations have also been observed.

== Signs and symptoms ==
=== Symptoms ===
People with PV can be asymptomatic.

Possible symptoms of PV that may aid identification include;

- pruritus (itching), particularly after exposure to warm water (such as when taking a bath), which may be due to abnormal histamine release or prostaglandin production. Such itching is present in 40–55% of patients with PV.
- erythromelalgia, a burning pain in the hands or feet, usually accompanied by a reddish or bluish coloration of the skin. Erythromelalgia is caused by an increased platelet count or increased platelet "stickiness" (aggregation), resulting in the formation of tiny blood clots in the vessels of the extremity; it responds rapidly to treatment with aspirin.

Other possible symptoms of PV include night sweats and fatigue.

No symptoms are required for diagnosis.

=== Other diseases that may be present with PV ===
Other diseases that may be present with PV include;

- An enlarged spleen, a manageable condition, may occur and may cause the spleen to be palpable in some patients. This may be associated with both the V617F mutation and the development of myelofibrosis.
- Swollen joints (Gout)
- Peptic ulcers.

== Diagnosis ==
=== Diagnostic criteria ===
==== WHO 2016 ====
Diagnostic criteria for polycythemia vera were modified by the World Health Organization in 2016.

There are 3 major criteria for PV diagnosis:

1. A very high red blood cell count, which is usually identified by elevated levels of hemoglobin or hematocrit;
2. A bone marrow biopsy that shows hypercellularity and abnormalities in megakaryocytes; and
3. The presence of a mutation in the Janus kinase 2 (JAK2) gene.

A minor diagnostic feature is that patients usually have a very low level of erythropoietin (EPO), a growth factor that increases the production of red blood cells. This is used to detect cases which are negative for JAK2 mutation.

==== Reviews 2023–25 ====
As of 2025, reviews state diagnosis can be based on

- the presence of a JAK2 mutation and
- hemoglobin/hematocrit levels of >16.5 g/dL/49% in men or 16 g/dL/48% in women.

Bone marrow morphologic confirmation is advised but not mandated.

== Outlook and prognosis ==
=== Prognosis ===
PV may remain stable for many years, with no effect on life expectancy, particularly if managed effectively. Studies show the median survival rate of controlled PV ranges from 10 to 20 years but most observations are of people diagnosed in their 60s. Patients live close to a normal life expectancy, but overall survival in PV is below that of age- and sex-matched general population. Factors predicting this may include age and detailed genetic differences.

=== Possible complications and developments ===
PV may cause blood clotting complications (thrombosis), with the two main risk factors being a previous clot or clots, and age (60 years or older). If PV is untreated, there is a substantial risk of Budd-Chiari syndrome (a hepatic vein thrombosis).

PV may develop into myelofibrosis (a rare bone marrow cancer) or acute myeloid leukemia.

Bleeding is a possible PV complication, although major bleeds are rare.

== Treatment and management ==
=== Overview ===
As of 2024, a cure for PV has not been found.

The treatment goal is to prevent thrombosis.

The "backbone" of treatment, regardless of risk category, if there are no contraindications, is;

- Periodic blood withdrawals (phlebotomy), to keep hematocrit level below 45%, and
- daily (or twice daily) aspirin (81 mg).

Additional management, depending on risks appraisal, may include meds.

A secondary treatment goal is to alleviate symptoms, for instance of pruritus (itching).

=== Blood withdrawals ===
Blood withdrawal, sometimes called phlebotomy or venesection, is a process similar to donating blood and helps to keep haematocrit levels low. This might be done weekly initially, and less often over time.

=== Medication ===
Rusfertide (Mimrylo) was approved for medical use in the United States in August 2026. It is the first approved treatment for polycythemia vera that mimics hepcidin, a hormone that naturally regulates iron in the body.

Aspirin may be taken, to reduce thrombosis risk, regardless of risk category.

Other medications may be used:

- Ruxolitinib (brand name Jakafi), a JAK2 inhibitor, and busulfan may be used as alternatives.
- Ropeginterferon alfa-2b (Besremi) reduces the rate of blood cell production, and can be used regardless of treatment history. Interferon alfa-2b is also used.
- Anagrelide with other cytoreductive drugs may be used to manage platelet levels.

Erlotinib may be an additional treatment option for those with certain genetic markers.

Allopurinol may be used to manage gout.

=== Lifestyle ===
A healthy lifestyle, including no smoking and avoidance of excessive weight, is also recommended.

=== Specialist care ===
A hematologist may be involved in the care of patients with PV.

=== Managing itching, if present ===
Ideas for managing itching include trying cooler showers and baths.

=== Managing emotional and practical effects ===
Patient education and patient forums can help patients practically and emotionally manage a PV diagnosis, symptoms and other practical considerations.

== Epidemiology ==
Polycythemia vera occurs in all age groups, although the incidence increases with age. One study found the median age at diagnosis to be 60 years, and another that the highest incidence was in people aged 70–79 years. 10% of PV patients are below age 40 years.

Overall incidences in population studies have been 1.9/100,000 person-years in a Minnesota study, and 1.48/100,000 person-years in an age-standardized Swedish study (n = 6281). PV can impact all ethnic groups. There are slightly more cases in men than women.

A cluster around a toxic site was confirmed in northeast Pennsylvania in 2008.

While the JAK2 V617F mutation is generally sporadic (random), a certain inherited haplotype of JAK2 has been associated with its development.

== Notable cases ==
Notable people living with PV include:

- Juan Alderete
- Will Self
- Maryam Moshiri

Few notable deaths have been attributed to PV. Instances (all aged 56 or older) are

- Alessandro Di Fiore (1965–2021), Italian entrepreneur.
- Phyllis George (1949–2020), American sportscaster and former First Lady of Kentucky
- Chet Lemon (1955–2025), American baseball player
- Ron Miles (1963–2022), American jazz trumpeter
- Nell Rankin (1924–2005), American mezzo-soprano

== History ==
Figures in the discovery of and development of treatment for PV include William Osler and Louis Henri Vaquez. Historically PV was called Osler–Vaquez disease.
