= Rusfertide =

Medication

Clinical data
- Trade names: Mimrylo
- Other names: PTG-300; TAK-121
- AHFS/Drugs.com: Mimrylo
- License data: US DailyMed: Rusfertide
- Routes of administration: Subcutaneous
- Drug class: Hepcidin mimetic
- ATC code: None

Legal status
- Legal status: US: ℞-only

Identifiers
- CAS Number: 1628323-80-7; as salt: 2273884-08-3
- PubChem CID: 155884410
- DrugBank: DB17724
- ChemSpider: 129955617
- UNII: XM71MYX0IQ; as salt: L82J8IP845
- KEGG: D12064; as salt: D12065
- ChEMBL: ChEMBL4650507

Chemical and physical data
- Formula: C_{114}H_{181}N_{27}O_{28}S_{2}
- Molar mass: 2441.98 g·mol^{−1}
- 3D model (JSmol): Interactive image
- SMILES: CCCCCCCCCCCCCCCC(=O)N[C@@H](CCC(=O)NCCCC[C@H]1C(=O)N[C@H](C(=O)N[C@H](C(=O)N2CCC[C@H]2C(=O)N[C@H](C(=O)N[C@H](C(=O)N[C@H](C(=O)NCC(=O)N[C@@H](CSSC[C@@H](C(=O)N[C@H](C(=O)N1)[C@@H](C)CC)NC(=O)[C@@H]3CCCN3C(=O)[C@H](CC4=CC=CC=C4)NC(=O)[C@H](CC5=CNC=N5)NC(=O)[C@H]([C@@H](C)O)NC(=O)[C@H](CC(=O)O)NC(=O)CC(C)C)C(=O)N[C@@H](CCCCN)C(=O)N)CCCCN)CO)CCCNC(=N)N)CCC(=O)O)CC6=CC=CC=C6)C(=O)O
- InChI: InChI=InChI=1S/C114H181N27O28S2/c1-7-9-10-11-12-13-14-15-16-17-18-19-26-46-90(145)125-79(113(168)169)47-49-89(144)121-53-32-29-42-76-99(154)133-80(58-71-36-22-20-23-37-71)101(156)132-78(48-50-93(148)149)111(166)140-55-34-44-87(140)107(162)130-77(43-33-54-122-114(118)119)100(155)136-84(64-142)104(159)129-75(41-28-31-52-116)98(153)123-63-92(147)127-85(105(160)128-74(97(117)152)40-27-30-51-115)65-170-171-66-86(106(161)138-95(69(5)8-2)109(164)131-76)137-108(163)88-45-35-56-141(88)112(167)83(59-72-38-24-21-25-39-72)135-102(157)81(60-73-62-120-67-124-73)134-110(165)96(70(6)143)139-103(158)82(61-94(150)151)126-91(146)57-68(3)4/h20-25,36-39,62,67-70,74-88,95-96,142-143H,7-19,26-35,40-61,63-66,115-116H2,1-6H3,(H2,117,152)(H,120,124)(H,121,144)(H,123,153)(H,125,145)(H,126,146)(H,127,147)(H,128,160)(H,129,159)(H,130,162)(H,131,164)(H,132,156)(H,133,154)(H,134,165)(H,135,157)(H,136,155)(H,137,163)(H,138,161)(H,139,158)(H,148,149)(H,150,151)(H,168,169)(H4,118,119,122)/t69-,70+,74-,75-,76-,77-,78-,79-,80-,81-,82-,83-,84-,85-,86-,87-,88-,95-,96-/m0/s1; Key:JRVOBXXOZFTSRF-GVIPULMVSA-N; Key:XDGUXPSNNIXCRG-RKJDWXQOSA-N

Rusfertide, sold under the brand name Mimrylo, is a medication used for the treatment of polycythemia vera. It is a hepcidin mimetic. It was developed by Protagonist Therapeutics in partnership with Takeda Pharmaceuticals. It is given by subcutaneous injection.

The most common adverse reactions include injection site reactions and anemia.

Rusfertide was approved for medical use in the United States in August 2026. It is the first approved treatment for polycythemia vera that mimics hepcidin, a hormone that naturally regulates iron in the body.

== Medical uses ==
Rusfertide is indicated for the treatment of erythrocytosis in adults with polycythemia vera.

Polycythemia vera ia a rare blood disorder that causes the body to make too many red blood cells. The excess cells can thicken the blood and increase the risk of cardiovascular issues, such as blood clots, stroke and heart attack.

== History ==
The safety and efficacy of rusfertide were evaluated in the VERIFY trial, a multicenter, randomized, double-blind, placebo-controlled phase III study of 293 adults with polycythemia vera who required frequent phlebotomies despite ongoing standard-of-care therapy. Participants were randomized 1:1 to receive either rusfertide or placebo over 32 weeks. Mimrylo treatment started at 19 mg, administered subcutaneously (under the skin) once weekly, and was titrated to maintain hematocrit levels below 45%.

Efficacy was measured by the proportion of participants who did not meet criteria for phlebotomy between weeks 20 and 32 of the study. Overall, 76.9% of participants on rusfertide required no phlebotomies during the 32-week period compared to 32.9% on placebo.

== Society and culture ==
=== Legal status ===
Rusfertide was approved for medical use in the United States in August 2026. The US Food and Drug Administration (FDA) granted the application for rusfertide priority review. The FDA granted the approval of Mimrylo to Takeda Pharmaceuticals America.

=== Names ===
Rusfertide is the international nonproprietary name.

Rusfertide is sold under the brand name Mimrylo.
