= Richard T. Silver =

Richard T. Silver (January 18, 1929–April 17, 2026) was an American medicine researcher and Weill Cornell Medicine professor best known for his work on leukemia and pioneering research on myeloproliferative neoplasms. He received multiple awards for his research and, in 2011, had Weill Cornell Medicine's RT Silver-Center on Myeloproliferative Neoplasms named in his honor.
