= Louis Henri Vaquez =

French internist (1860–1936)

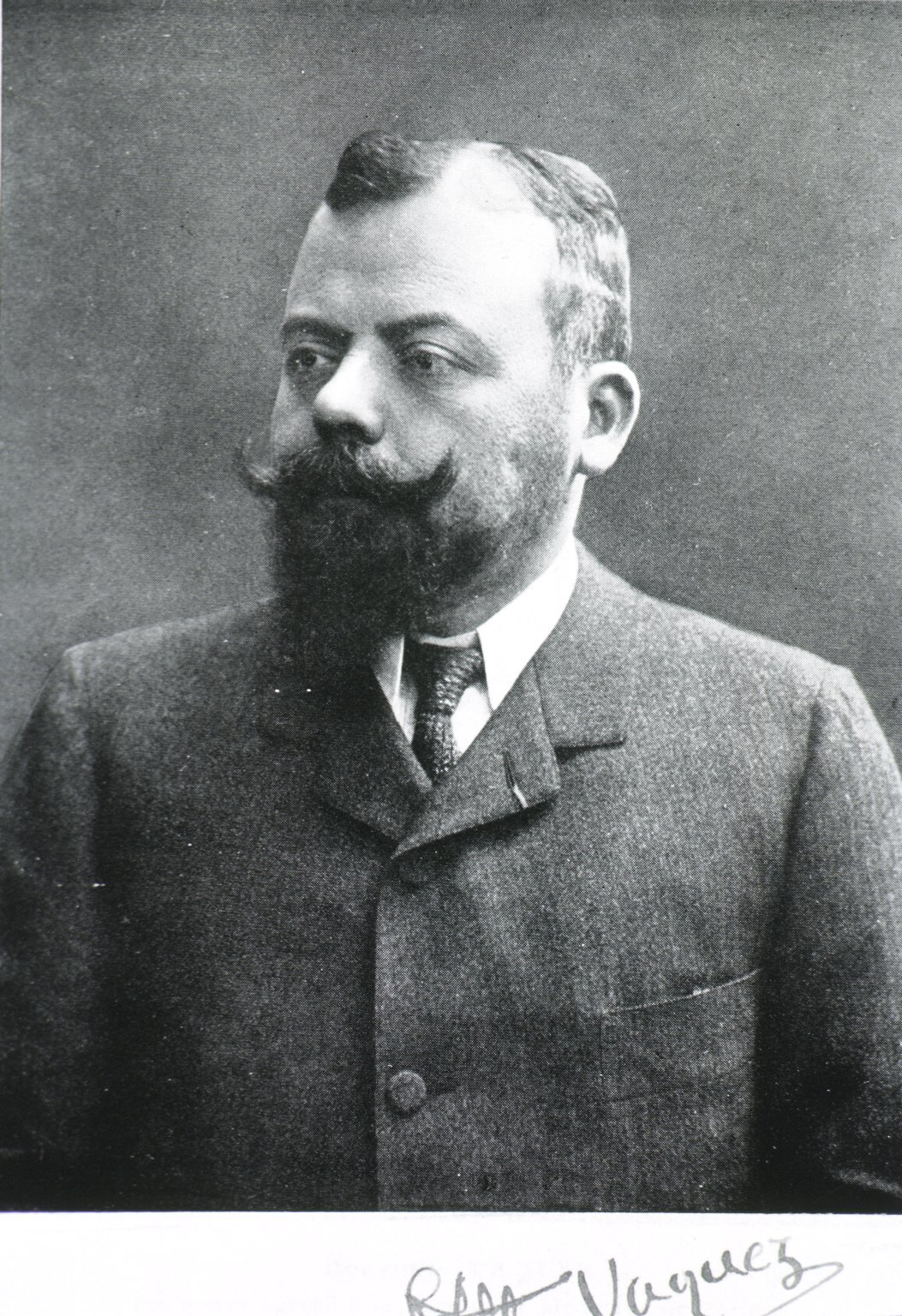
Louis Henri Vaquez (1860-1936)

Louis Henri Vaquez (27 August 1860 – 15 April 1936) was a French internist born in Paris. He is known for his work in the field of hematology and his research of heart disease.

In 1890 he earned his medical doctorate, and in 1895 became médecin des hôpitaux in Paris. In 1898 he was promoted to professeur agrégé, and in 1918 was appointed professor of clinical medicine and elected a member of the Academy of Medicine. Cardiologist Pierre Potain (1825–1901) was an important influence in his medical career.

In 1892 he was the first to describe the blood disorder polycythaemia vera or polycythaemia rubra vera, which is also known as "Osler-Vaquez disease" (named with physician William Osler (1849–1919). Vaquez described the disease in a 40-year-old male suffering from chronic cyanosis, distended veins, vertigo, dyspnea, hepatosplenomegaly, palpitations and marked erythrocytosis.

He was among the first physicians to recognize the correlation of Stokes-Adams attack to interference of the bundle of His causing a discordant beating of the atria in relation to that of the ventricles. He is credited with introducing the electrocardiogram and recording of the jugular venous pulse into French medicine. He also conducted research of cardiac arrhythmia and hypertension.

Vaquez was founder and editor of the journal Archives des maladies du coeur, vaissaux et du sang.

== Bibliography ==
- Sur une forme spéciale de cyanose s’accompagnant d’hyperglobulie excessive et persistante. Comptes rendus de la Société de biologie, Paris, 1892, 44: 384-388.
- Les arythmies. Paris, J. Baillière, 1911
- Le cæur et l’aorte. with E. Bordet. Paris, 1913; 4th edition, 1928.
- Maladies du coeur. Paris, 1920; 2nd edition, 1928
- Les troubles du rythme cardiaque, with Edouard Donzelot (1884–1960); Paris, 1926.
