= Karin Hoffmeister =

Silesia-born physician-scientist

Karin Hoffmeister is a Silesia-born physician-scientist specializing in glycoscience, the study of sugars and carbohydrates on cell surfaces. She holds the Hauske Family Endowed Chair in Glycobiology at the Versiti Blood Research Institute.

== Early life and education ==
Hoffmeister was born in Silesia and obtained her MD at the University of Aachen in Germany.

== Career ==
Hoffmeister chose to study glycans because they are on the cell surface, where they are visible to the immune system, and they underlie the ABO blood groups which play key roles in blood transfusion and organ transplantation. Her work has helped show how glycan patterns contribute to blood cell production, cancer biology, sickle cell anemia, and other diseases. She has described her goal as trying to "unravel the sugar-code".

In 2003, Hoffmeister was first author on a Science paper testing a new technique to prevent chilled platelets from being cleared by macrophages, in hopes of extending the shelf life of platelets to ease inventory management constraints and reduce the chance of septic reactions. The technique involved covering a sugar on the platelet surface with galactose. Hoffmeister was promoted to Associate Professor at Harvard Medical School.

In 2017, she joined Versiti Blood Research Institute in Milwaukee and established its Translational Glycomics Center. Her work on sialic acid has helped identify new therapeutic targets for treating immune thrombocytopenic purpura.

She is principal investigator of the NHLBI career development consortium for excellence in glycoscience.

== Awards ==
2005 Pew Scholar
