= Erythroferrone =

Mammalian protein found in Homo sapiens

ERFE

Identifiers
- Aliases: ERFE, C1QTNF15, CTRP15, FAM132B, Erythroferrone, family with sequence similarity 132 member B
- External IDs: OMIM: 615099; MGI: 3606476; GeneCards: ERFE

Gene location (Human)
Chr.	Chromosome 2 (human)
Band	2q37.3	Start	238,158,970 bp
Band	2q37.3	End	238,168,900 bp

Gene location (Mouse)
Chr.	Chromosome 1 (mouse)
Band	1|1 D	Start	91,294,152 bp
Band	1|1 D	End	91,301,939 bp
RNA expression pattern
Bgee	Human / Mouse (ortholog); Top expressed in: tibialis anterior muscle; right testis; left testis; oocyte; right hemisphere of cerebellum; testicle; gastrocnemius muscle; cartilage tissue; sperm; secondary oocyte / Top expressed in: primary oocyte; adrenal gland; secondary oocyte; tail of embryo; morula; epiblast; ileum; embryo; embryo; blastocyst; More reference expression data
BioGPS	n/a
Gene ontology
Molecular function	protein homodimerization activity; hormone activity
Cellular component	extracellular region; extracellular space
Biological process	positive regulation of fatty acid transport; regulation of fatty acid metabolic process; cellular iron ion homeostasis; regulation of signaling receptor activity; signal transduction
Sources:Amigo / QuickGO
Orthologs
Databases	NCBI: entry; OMA: entry
Species	Human	Mouse
Entrez	151176	227358
Ensembl	ENSG00000178752	ENSMUSG00000047443
UniProt	Q4G0M1	Q6PGN1
RefSeq (mRNA)	NM_152521; NM_001291832	NM_173395
RefSeq (protein)	NP_001278761	NP_775571
Location (UCSC)	Chr 2: 238.16 – 238.17 Mb	Chr 1: 91.29 – 91.3 Mb
PubMed search
- Wikidata
View/Edit Human	View/Edit Mouse

Erythroferrone is a protein hormone encoded in humans by the ERFE gene. Erythroferrone is produced by erythroblasts, inhibits the production of hepcidin in the liver, and so increases the amount of iron available for hemoglobin synthesis. Skeletal muscle secreted ERFE has been shown to maintain systemic metabolic homeostasis.

== Discovery ==
It was identified in 2014 in mice where the transcript was found in bone marrow, encoded by the mouse Fam132b gene. The homologous gene in humans is FAM132B and the sequence is conserved in other species. The protein is synthesized by erythroblasts and secreted. This sequence had previously been found expressed in mouse skeletal muscle, called myonectin (CTRP15), and linked to lipid homeostasis.

Myonectin was shown in 2015 to be identical to erythroferrone, a hormone produced in erythroblasts that is involved in iron metabolism.

== Structure ==
Erythroferrone in humans is transcribed as a precursor of 354 amino acids, with a signal peptide of 28 amino acids. The mouse gene encodes a 340 amino acid protein which is 71% identical. Homology is greater at the C-terminal where there is a TNF-alpha-like domain. As a member of the C1q/TNF-Related Protein (CTRP) family, erythroferrone has a 4-domain structure with a unique N-terminus. The two larger domains are connected by a short, proline-rich, collagenous linker that is thought to promote protein multimerization. Erythroferrone is predicted to contain two PCSK3/furin recognition sites. The protein hormone weighs approximately 35-40 kDa.

== Function ==
Erythroferrone is a hormone that regulates iron metabolism through its actions on hepcidin. As shown in mice and humans, it is produced in erythroblasts, which proliferate when new red cells are synthesized, such as after hemorrhage when more iron is needed (so-called stress erythropoiesis). This process is governed by the renal hormone, erythropoietin.

Its mechanism of action is to inhibit the expression of the liver hormone, hepcidin. This process is governed by the renal hormone, erythropoietin. By suppressing hepcidin, ERFE increases the function of the cellular iron export channel, ferroportin. This then results in increased iron absorption from the intestine and mobilization of iron from stores, which can then be used in the synthesis of hemoglobin in new red blood cells. Erythroferrone inhibits hepcidin synthesis by binding bone morphogenetic proteins and thereby inhibiting the bone morphogenetic protein pathway that controls hepcidin expression.

Mice deficient in the gene encoding erythroferrone have transient maturational hemoglobin deficits and impaired hepcidin suppression in response to phlebotomy with a delayed recovery from anemia.

In its role as myonectin, it also promotes lipid uptake into adipocytes and hepatocytes.

== Regulation ==
Synthesis of erythroferrone is stimulated by erythropoietin binding to its receptor and activating the Jak2/Stat5 signaling pathway.

== Clinical significance ==
The clinical significance in humans is becoming clear. From parallels in the mouse studies, there may be diseases where its function could be relevant. In a mouse model of thalassemia, its expression is increased, resulting in iron overload, which is also a feature of the human disease. A role in the recovery from the anemia of inflammation in mice has been shown and involvement in inherited anemias with ineffective erythropoiesis, anemia of chronic kidney diseases and iron-refractory iron-deficiency anemia has been suggested.

Erythroferrone levels in blood have been shown by immunoassay to be higher after blood loss or erythropoetin administration. Patients with beta-thalassemia have very high levels, and these decrease after blood transfusion.
