= Polycythemia =

Laboratory diagnosis of high hemoglobin content in blood

- Other names: Erythrocytosis, Hypercythemia, Hypererythrocythemia
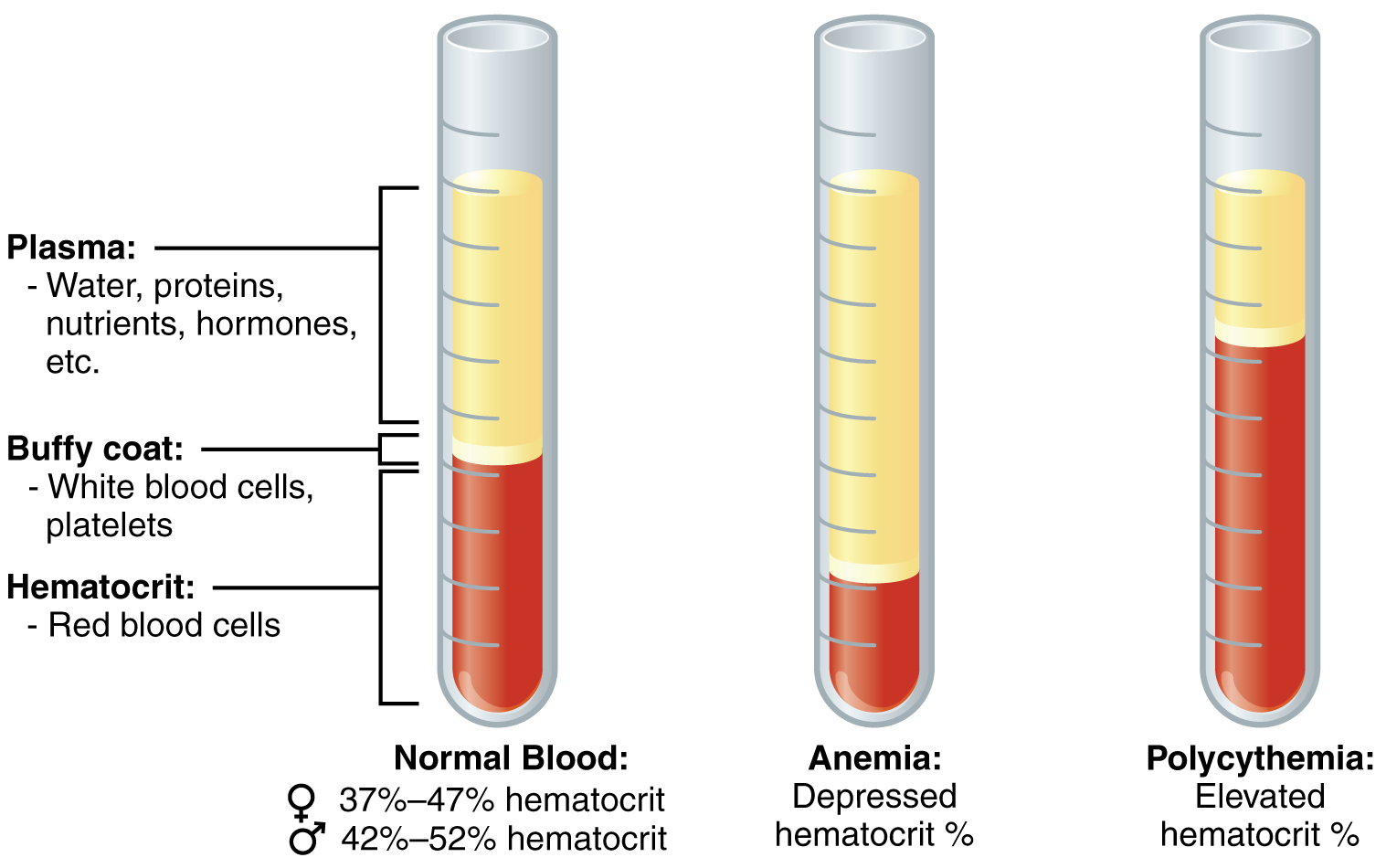
- Diagram illustrating normal composition of blood compared to anemia and polycythemia
- Specialty: Hematology

Polycythemia (also spelt polycythaemia) is a medical condition suggested by a laboratory finding that the hematocrit (the volume percentage of red blood cells in the blood) and/or hemoglobin concentration are increased in the blood, although this finding is also present in capillary leak syndrome. Polycythemia is sometimes called erythrocytosis, and there is significant overlap in the two findings, but the terms are not the same: polycythemia describes any increase in hematocrit and/or hemoglobin, while erythrocytosis describes an increase specifically in the number of red blood cells in the blood.

Polycythemia has many causes. It can describe an increase in the number of red blood cells ("absolute polycythemia") or a decrease in the volume of plasma ("relative polycythemia"). Absolute polycythemia can be due to genetic mutations in the bone marrow ("primary polycythemia"), physiological adaptations to one's environment, medications, and/or other health conditions. Laboratory studies such as serum erythropoeitin levels and genetic testing might be helpful to clarify the cause of polycythemia if the physical exam and patient history do not reveal a likely cause.

Mild polycythemia on its own is often asymptomatic. Treatment for polycythemia varies, and typically involves treating its underlying cause. Treatment of primary polycythemia (see polycythemia vera) could involve phlebotomy, antiplatelet therapy to reduce risk of blood clots, and additional cytoreductive therapy to reduce the number of red blood cells produced in the bone marrow.

== Definition ==
Polycythemia is defined as serum hematocrit (Hct) or hemoglobin (HgB) exceeding normal ranges expected for age and gender, typically Hct >49% in healthy adult men and >48% in women, or HgB >16.5 g/dL in men or >16.0 g/dL in women. The definition is different for neonates and varies by age in children.

== Differential diagnoses ==
=== Polycythemia in adults ===
Different diseases or conditions can cause polycythemia in adults. These processes are discussed in more detail in their respective sections below.

Relative polycythemia, also known as pseudopolycythemia, is not a true increase in the number of red blood cells or hemoglobin in the blood, but rather an elevated laboratory finding caused by reduced blood plasma (hypovolemia, cf. dehydration). Relative polycythemia is often caused by loss of body fluids, such as through burns, dehydration, and stress. A specific type of relative polycythemia is Gaisböck syndrome; in this syndrome, primarily occurring in obese men, hypertension causes a reduction in plasma volume, resulting in (amongst other changes) a relative increase in red blood cell count. If relative polycythemia is deemed unlikely because the patient has no other signs of hemoconcentration and has sustained polycythemia without clear loss of body fluids, the patient likely has absolute or true polycythemia.

Absolute or true polycythemia (also erythrocytosis) can be split into two categories:

- Primary polycythemia, that is the overproduction of red blood cells due to a primary process in the bone marrow (a so-called myeloproliferative disease; eg. polycythemia vera). These can be familial or congenital, or acquired later in life.
- Secondary polycythemia, whenever additional red blood cells may have been received through another process — for example, being over-transfused (either accidentally or, as blood doping, deliberately).

=== Polycythemia in neonates ===
Polycythemia in newborns is defined as hematocrit > 65%. Significant polycythemia can be associated with blood hyperviscosity, or thickening of the blood. Causes of neonatal polycythemia include:

- Hypoxia: Poor oxygen delivery (hypoxia) in utero resulting in compensatory increased production of red blood cells (erythropoeisis). Hypoxia can be either acute or chronic. Acute hypoxia can occur as a result of perinatal complications. Chronic fetal hypoxia is associated with maternal risk factors such as hypertension, diabetes and smoking.
- Umbilical cord stripping: delayed cord clamping and the stripping of the umbilical cord towards the baby can cause the residual blood in the cord/placenta to enter fetal circulation, which can increase blood volume.
- The recipient twin in a pregnancy undergoing twin-to-twin transfusion syndrome can have polycythemia.

== Pathophysiology ==
The pathophysiology of polycythemia varies based on its cause. The production of red blood cells (or erythropoeisis) in the body is regulated by erythropoietin, which is a protein produced by the kidneys in response to poor oxygen delivery. As a result, more erythropoietin is produced to encourage red blood cell production and increase oxygen-carrying capacity. This results in secondary polycythemia, which can be an appropriate response to hypoxic conditions such as chronic smoking, obstructive sleep apnea, and high altitude. Furthermore, certain genetic conditions can impair the body's accurate detection of oxygen levels in the serum, which leads to excess erythropoietin production even without hypoxia or impaired oxygen delivery to tissues. Alternatively, certain types of cancers, most notably renal cell carcinoma, and medications such as testosterone use can cause inappropriate erythropoietin production that stimulates red cell production despite adequate oxygen delivery.

Primary polycythemia, on the other hand, is caused by genetic mutations or defects of the red cell progenitors within the bone marrow, leading to overgrowth and hyperproliferation of red blood cells regardless of erythropoeitin levels.

Increased hematocrit and red cell mass with polycythemia increases the viscosity of blood, leading to impaired blood flow and contributing to an increased risk of clotting (thrombosis).

== Evaluation ==
=== History and physical exam ===
The first step to evaluate new polycythemia in any individual is to conduct a detailed history and physical exam. Patients should be asked about smoking history, altitude, medication use, personal bleeding and clotting history, symptoms of sleep apnea (snoring, apneic episodes), and any family history of hematologic conditions or polycythemia. A thorough cardiopulmonary exam including auscultation of the heart and lungs can help evaluate for cardiac shunting or chronic pulmonary disease. An abdominal exam can assess for splenomegaly, which can be seen in polycythemia vera. Examination of digits for erythromelalgia, clubbing or cyanosis can help assess for chronic hypoxia.

=== Laboratory evaluation ===
Polycythemia is often initially identified on a complete blood count (CBC). The CBC is often repeated to evaluate for persistent polycythemia. If an etiology of polycythemia is unclear from history or physical, additional laboratory evaluation might include:

- Blood smear to evaluate cell morphology
- Iron panel to evaluate for concurrent iron deficiency
- JAK2 mutation testing
- Serum erythropoeitin (EPO) levels
- Oxygen saturation (usually via pulse oximetry or blood gas tests) or oxygen dissociation tests

=== Additional testing ===
- Sleep studies if high suspicion for sleep apnea
- Abdominal imaging, such as ultrasound
- Erythropoietin receptor or von Hippel–Lindau (VHL) genetic testing, if high suspicion for familial erythrocytosis
- Hemoglobin (globin-gene) sequencing or high-performance liquid chromatography to evaluate for high-affinity hemoglobin variants
- Bone marrow biopsy might be considered in specific cases

== Polycythemia types ==
=== Primary polycythemia ===
Primary polycythemias are myeloproliferative diseases affecting red blood cell precursors in the bone marrow. Polycythemia vera (PCV) (a.k.a. polycythemia rubra vera (PRV)) occurs when excess red blood cells are produced as a result of an abnormality of the bone marrow. Often, excess white blood cells and platelets are also produced. A hallmark of polycythemia vera is an elevated hematocrit, with Hct > 55% seen in 83% of cases. A somatic (non-hereditary) mutation (V617F) in the JAK2 gene, also present in other myeloproliferative disorders, is found in 95% of cases. Symptoms include headaches and vertigo, and signs on physical examination include an abnormally enlarged spleen and/or liver. Studies suggest that mean arterial pressure (MAP) only increases when hematocrit levels are 20% over baseline. When hematocrit levels are lower than that percentage, the MAP decreases in response, which may be due, in part, to the increase in viscosity and the decrease in plasma layer width. Furthermore, affected individuals may have other associated conditions alongside high blood pressure, including formation of blood clots. Transformation to acute leukemia is rare. Phlebotomy is the mainstay of treatment.

Primary familial polycythemia, also known as primary familial and congenital polycythemia (PFCP), exists as a benign hereditary condition, in contrast with the myeloproliferative changes associated with acquired PCV. In many families, PFCP is due to an autosomal dominant mutation in the EPOR erythropoietin receptor gene. PFCP can cause an increase of up to 50% in the oxygen-carrying capacity of the blood; skier Eero Mäntyranta had PFCP, which is speculated to have given him an advantage in endurance events.

=== Secondary polycythemia ===
Secondary polycythemia is caused by either natural or artificial increases in the production of erythropoietin, hence an increased production of erythrocytes.

Secondary polycythemia in which the production of erythropoietin increases appropriately is called physiologic polycythemia. Conditions which may result in physiologic polycythemia include:

- Altitude related – Polycythemia can be a normal adaptation to living at high altitudes (see altitude sickness). Many athletes train at high altitude to take advantage of this effect, which can be considered a legal form of blood doping, although the efficacy of this strategy is unclear.
- Hypoxic disease-associated – for example, in cyanotic heart disease where blood oxygen levels are reduced significantly; in hypoxic lung disease such as COPD; in chronic obstructive sleep apnea; conditions that reduce blood flow to the kidney e.g. renal artery stenosis. Chronic carbon monoxide poisoning (which can be present in heavy smokers) and rarely methemoglobinemia can also impair oxygen delivery.
- Genetic – Heritable causes of secondary polycythemia include abnormalities in hemoglobin oxygen release, which results in a greater inherent affinity for oxygen than normal adult hemoglobin and reduces oxygen delivery to tissues.

Conditions where the secondary polycythemia is not caused by physiologic adaptation, and occurs irrespective of body needs include:

- Neoplasms – Renal cell carcinoma, liver tumors, Von Hippel–Lindau disease, and endocrine abnormalities including pheochromocytoma and adrenal adenoma with Cushing's syndrome.
- Anabolic steroid use – people whose testosterone levels are high, including athletes who abuse steroids, people on testosterone replacement for hypogonadism or transgender hormone replacement therapy.
- Blood doping – Athletes who take erythropoietin-stimulating agents or receive blood transfusions to increase their red blood cell mass.
- Post-transplant erythrocytosis – About 10–15% of patients after renal transplantation are found to have polycythemia at 24 months after transplantation, which can be associated with increased thrombotic (clotting) risk.

==== Testosterone replacement therapy (TRT) and secondary polycythemia ====
Testosterone replacement therapy (TRT) causes secondary polycythemia by stimulating the body's natural pathways that regulate red blood cell production, rather than from an inherent bone marrow disorder. Testosterone increases the production of erythropoietin (EPO) in the kidneys, a hormone that signals the bone marrow to make more red blood cells. At the same time, testosterone suppresses the liver hormone hepcidin, which normally limits the absorption and mobilization of iron. With less hepcidin, iron becomes more available for hemoglobin synthesis, further fueling red blood cell production. This combination of increased EPO signaling and enhanced iron supply amplifies erythropoiesis, leading to elevated hematocrit and hemoglobin levels. The effect is most pronounced with injectable forms of testosterone that create high peak serum levels, which strongly stimulate these pathways. Because the mechanism is driven by a hormonal stimulus and not by a primary bone marrow abnormality, the condition is classified as secondary polycythemia. Clinically, this distinction is important, as TRT-induced secondary polycythemia resolves or improves with dose adjustment, delivery method changes, or therapeutic phlebotomy, whereas primary polycythemia reflects a chronic clonal disorder of hematopoietic stem cells.

==== Altered oxygen sensing ====
Rare inherited mutations in three genes which all result in increased stability of hypoxia-inducible factors, leading to increased erythropoietin production, have been shown to cause secondary polycythemia:

- Chuvash erythrocytosis or Chuvash polycythemia is an autosomal recessive form of erythrocytosis endemic in patients from the Chuvash Republic in Russia. Chuvash erythrocytosis is associated with homozygosity for a C598T mutation in the von Hippel–Lindau gene (VHL), which is needed for the destruction of hypoxia-inducible factors in the presence of oxygen. Clusters of patients with Chuvash erythrocytosis have been found in other populations, such as on the Italian island of Ischia, located in the Bay of Naples. Patients with Chuvash erythrocytosis experience a significantly elevated risk of events.
- PHD2 erythrocytosis: Heterozygosity for loss-of-function mutations of the PHD2 gene are associated with autosomal dominant erythrocytosis and increased hypoxia-inducible factors activity.
- HIF2α erythrocytosis: Gain-of-function mutations in HIF2α are associated with autosomal dominant erythrocytosis and pulmonary hypertension.

== Symptoms ==
Polycythemia is often asymptomatic; patients may not experience any notable symptoms until their red cell count is very high. For patients with significant elevations in hemoglobin or hematocrit (often from polycythemia vera), some non-specific symptoms include:

- A ruddy (red) complexion, or plethora
- Headache, transient blurry vision (amaurosis fugax), other signs of a transient ischemic attack (TIA) or stroke
- Dizziness, fatigue
- Unusual bleeding, nosebleeds
- Pain in abdomen from enlarged spleen in polycythemia vera
- Pain in hands and feet (erythromelalgia)
- Itchiness, especially after a hot shower (aquagenic pruritis)
- Numbness or tingling in different body parts

== Epidemiology ==
The prevalence of primary polycythemia (polycythemia vera) was estimated to be approximately 44–57 per 100,000 individuals in the United States. Secondary polycythemia is considered to be more common, but its exact prevalence is unknown. In one study using the NHANES dataset, the prevalence of unexplained erythrocytosis is 35.1 per 100,000, and was higher among males and among individuals between ages 50–59 and 60–69.

== Management ==
The management of polycythemia varies based on its etiology:

- See polycythemia vera for management of primary polycythemia, which involves reducing thrombotic risk, symptom amelioration and monitoring for further hematologic complications. Treatment can include phlebotomy, aspirin, and myelosuppressive or cytoreductive medications based on risk stratification.
- For secondary polycythemia, management involves addressing the underlying etiology of increased erythropoeitin production, such as smoking cessation, CPAP for sleep apnea, or removing any EPO-producing tumours. Phlebotomy is not typically recommended for patients with physiologic polycythemia, who rely on additional red cell mass for necessary oxygen delivery, unless the patient is clearly symptomatic and experiences relief from phlebotomy. It is unclear if patients with secondary polycythemia are at elevated thrombotic risk, but aspirin can be considered for patients at elevated cardiovascular risk or for patients with Chuvash polycythemia. The first-line treatment for post-transplant erythrocytosis specificity is angiotensin-converting enzyme (ACE) inhibitors or angiotensin receptor blockers.

=== Relation to athletic performance ===
Polycythemia is theorized to increased performance in endurance sports due to the blood being able to store more oxygen. This idea has led to the illegal use of blood doping and transfusions among professional athletes, as well as use of altitude training or elevation training masks to simulate a low-oxygen environment. However, the benefits of altitude training for athletes to improve sea-level performance are not universally accepted, with one reason being athletes at altitude might exert less power during training.

== See also ==
- Anemia, a decrease in red blood cell count
- Cytopenia, a decrease in blood cell count
- Capillary leak syndrome, another cause of hemoconcentration
