= TMPRSS6 =

Protein-coding gene in the species Homo sapiens

Identifiers
- Aliases: TMPRSS6, IRIDA, transmembrane protease, serine 6, matriptase-2, transmembrane serine protease 6
- External IDs: OMIM: 609862; MGI: 1919003; GeneCards: TMPRSS6

Gene location (Human)
| Chr. | Chromosome 22 (human) |
| Band | 22q12.3 | Start | 37,065,436 bp |
| Band | 22q12.3 | End | 37,109,563 bp |

Gene location (Mouse)
| Chr. | Chromosome 15 (mouse) |
| Band | 15|15 E1 | Start | 78,323,867 bp |
| Band | 15|15 E1 | End | 78,352,834 bp |
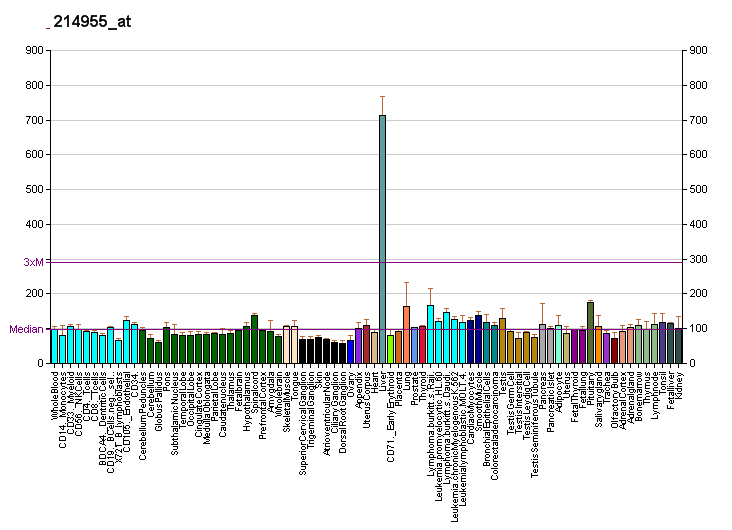
RNA expression pattern
| Bgee | Human / Mouse (ortholog); Top expressed in: right lobe of liver; lactiferous duct; pancreatic ductal cell; pituitary gland; anterior pituitary; right testis; cardia; left testis; putamen; secondary oocyte / Top expressed in: left lobe of liver; otolith organ; utricle; olfactory epithelium; gallbladder; vestibular sensory epithelium; vestibular membrane of cochlear duct; embryo; embryo; temporal muscle; More reference expression data |
| BioGPS | More reference expression data |
Gene ontology
| Molecular function | serine-type peptidase activity; peptidase activity; protein binding; hydrolase activity; serine-type endopeptidase activity; metalloendopeptidase activity |
| Cellular component | membrane; integral component of membrane; intracellular anatomical structure; extracellular space; plasma membrane |
| Biological process | membrane protein proteolysis; intracellular signal transduction; angiogenesis; fibrinolysis; negative regulation of BMP signaling pathway; self proteolysis; extracellular matrix organization; negative regulation of transcription, DNA-templated; proteolysis; cellular iron ion homeostasis; iron ion homeostasis; negative regulation of transcription by RNA polymerase II; positive regulation of transcription by RNA polymerase II; extracellular matrix disassembly; collagen catabolic process |
Sources:Amigo / QuickGO
Orthologs
| Databases | NCBI: entry; OMA: entry |
| Species | Human | Mouse |
| Entrez | 164656 | 71753 |
| Ensembl | ENSG00000187045 | ENSMUSG00000016942 |
| UniProt | Q8IU80 | Q9DBI0 |
| RefSeq (mRNA) | NM_001289000; NM_001289001; NM_153609 | NM_027902; NM_001355601 |
| RefSeq (protein) | NP_001275929; NP_001275930; NP_705837; NP_001361433 | NP_082178; NP_001342530 |
| Location (UCSC) | Chr 22: 37.07 – 37.11 Mb | Chr 15: 78.32 – 78.35 Mb |
| PubMed search |
- Wikidata
| View/Edit Human | View/Edit Mouse |

Transmembrane protease, serine 6 (also known as matriptase-2) is an enzyme that in humans is encoded by the TMPRSS6 gene.

Based on twin studies, mutations in TMPRSS6 gene have a correlation with iron deficiency predisposition.

The protein encoded by this gene is a type II transmembrane serine proteinase that is found attached to the cell surface. The encoded protein may be involved in matrix remodeling processes in the liver.
