= Hepcidin =

Protein-coding gene in the species Homo sapiens

HAMP
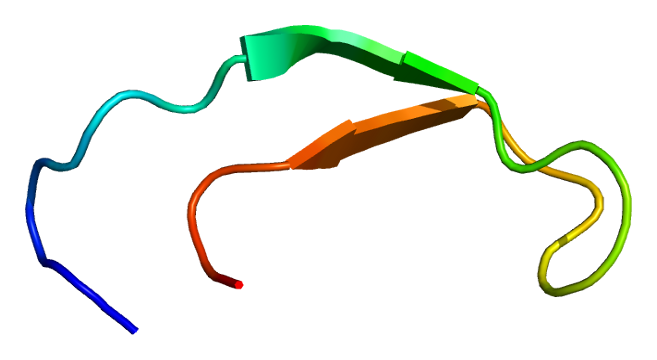

Identifiers
- Aliases: HAMP, HEPC, HFE2B, LEAP1, PLTR, hepcidin antimicrobial peptide
- External IDs: OMIM: 606464; MGI: 2153530; GeneCards: HAMP
Available structures
PDB	Ortholog search: PDBe RCSB
PDB	List of PDB id codes 1M4E, 1M4F, 2KEF, 3H0T, 4QAE

Gene location (Human)
Chr.	Chromosome 19 (human)
Band	19q13.12	Start	35,280,716 bp
Band	19q13.12	End	35,285,143 bp

Gene location (Mouse)
Chr.	Chromosome 7 (mouse)
Band	7 B1|7 19.27 cM	Start	30,621,797 bp
Band	7 B1|7 19.27 cM	End	30,624,106 bp
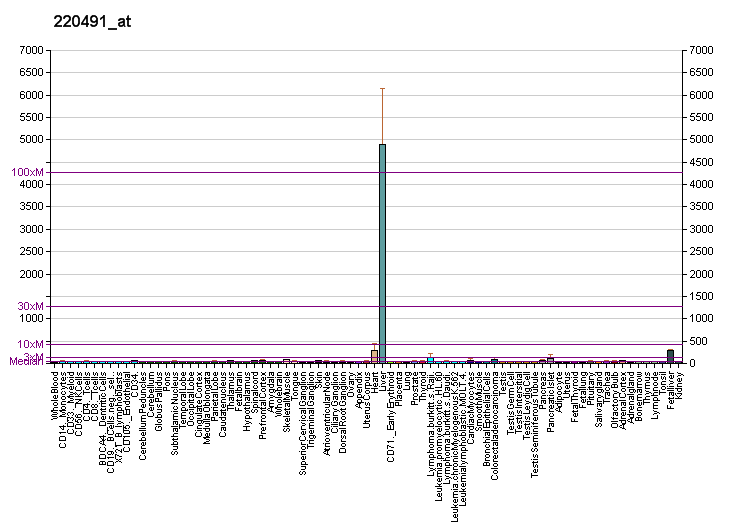
RNA expression pattern
Bgee	Human / Mouse (ortholog); Top expressed in: right lobe of liver; right auricle of heart; cardiac muscle tissue of right atrium; C1 segment; optic nerve; caput epididymis; body of pancreas; pancreatic ductal cell; internal globus pallidus; Skeletal muscle tissue of rectus abdominis / Top expressed in: epithelium of stomach; left lobe of liver; mucous cell of stomach; pyloric antrum; islet of Langerhans; secondary oocyte; zygote; skin of back; primary oocyte; thymus; More reference expression data
BioGPS	More reference expression data
Gene ontology
Molecular function	hormone activity; iron ion transmembrane transporter inhibitor activity; signaling receptor binding
Cellular component	cytoplasm; extracellular region; apical cortex; intercalated disc; extracellular space
Biological process	negative regulation of iron export across plasma membrane; negative regulation of intestinal absorption; positive regulation of receptor internalization; negative regulation of transcription by RNA polymerase II; negative regulation of iron ion transmembrane transporter activity; response to iron ion; multicellular organismal iron ion homeostasis; defense response to bacterium; immune response; positive regulation of receptor catabolic process; positive regulation of protein polyubiquitination; negative regulation of ion transmembrane transporter activity; cellular iron ion homeostasis; cellular response to lipopolysaccharide; ageing; cellular response to tumor necrosis factor; liver regeneration; cellular response to bile acid; cellular response to interleukin-6; response to iron ion starvation; response to vitamin A; response to erythropoietin; positive regulation of cell growth involved in cardiac muscle cell development; response to ethanol; acute-phase response; cellular response to X-ray; response to zinc ion; negative regulation of iron ion transmembrane transport; antimicrobial humoral immune response mediated by antimicrobial peptide; killing of cells of other organism; defense response to fungus; regulation of signaling receptor activity; signal transduction
Sources:Amigo / QuickGO
Orthologs
Databases	NCBI: entry; OMA: entry
Species	Human	Mouse
Entrez	57817	66438
Ensembl	ENSG00000105697	ENSMUSG00000056978
UniProt	P81172	Q80T19
RefSeq (mRNA)	NM_021175	NM_183257
RefSeq (protein)	NP_066998	NP_899080
Location (UCSC)	Chr 19: 35.28 – 35.29 Mb	Chr 7: 30.62 – 30.62 Mb
PubMed search
- Wikidata
View/Edit Human	View/Edit Mouse

Hepcidin
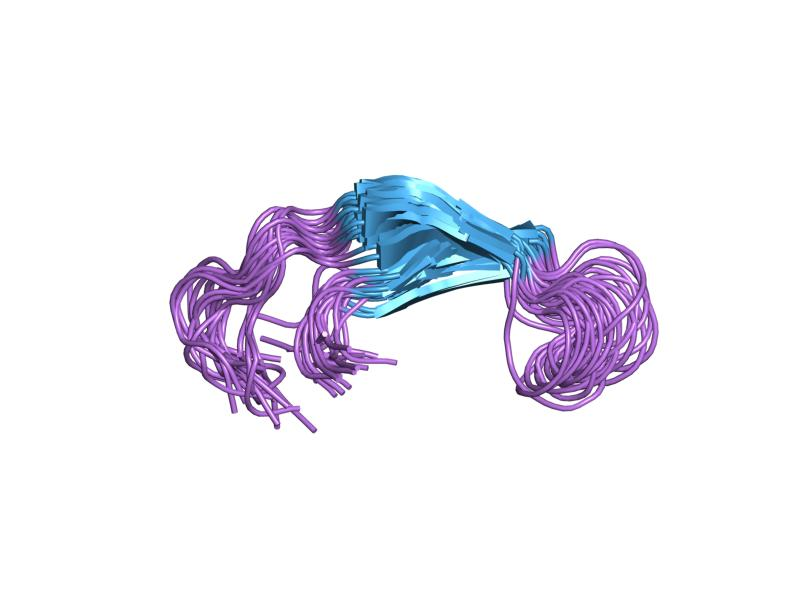
- Solution structure of hepcidin-25

Identifiers
- Symbol: Hepcidin
- Pfam: PF06446
- InterPro: IPR010500
- SCOP2: 1m4f / SCOPe / SUPFAM
- OPM superfamily: 153
- OPM protein: 1m4e
Available protein structures:
- PDB: IPR010500 PF06446 (ECOD; PDBsum)
- AlphaFold: IPR010500; PF06446

hepcidin antimicrobial peptide

Identifiers
- Symbol: HAMP
- NCBI gene: 57817
- HGNC: 15598
- OMIM: 606464
- RefSeq: NM_021175
- UniProt: P81172

Other data
- Locus: Chr. 19 q13.1
Search for
- Structures: Swiss-model
- Domains: InterPro

Hepcidin is a protein that in humans is encoded by the HAMP gene. Hepcidin is a key regulator of the entry of iron into the circulation in mammals.

During conditions in which the hepcidin level is abnormally high, such as inflammation, serum iron falls due to iron trapping within macrophages and liver cells and decreased gut iron absorption. This typically leads to anemia due to an inadequate amount of blood serum iron being available for developing red blood cells. When the hepcidin level is abnormally low, such as in hemochromatosis, iron overload occurs due to increased ferroportin mediated iron efflux from storage and increased gut iron absorption.

== Structure ==
Hepcidin is initially synthesized as an 84-amino acid preprohormone (preprohepcidin) which undergoes sequential cleavages to form the active, mature hormone. The first cleavage by signal peptidase removes the 24-amino acid N-terminal signal peptide, creating a 60-amino acid prohepcidin. Furin-like convertase and α-1 antitrypsin then cleave prohepcidin to remove a 35-amino acid proregion, resulting in the 25-amino acid mature, bioactive hepcidin. There are also shorter isoforms of hepcidin, with 20 and 22 amino acids, which have minimal iron regulatory activity. Only the 9 N-terminal amino acids are essential for hepcidin's biological activity, specifically its ability to bind to ferroportin and regulate iron metabolism.

Structurally, hepcidin is a tightly folded polypeptide with 32% beta-sheet character and a hairpin tertiary structure stabilized by four disulfide bonds among eight cysteine residues (crucial structure). Hepcidin's structure has been elucidated through solution NMR, revealing that it interconverts between two conformations at different temperatures. X-ray analysis of a co-crystal with Fab confirmed a structure similar to the high-temperature NMR structure.

== Function ==
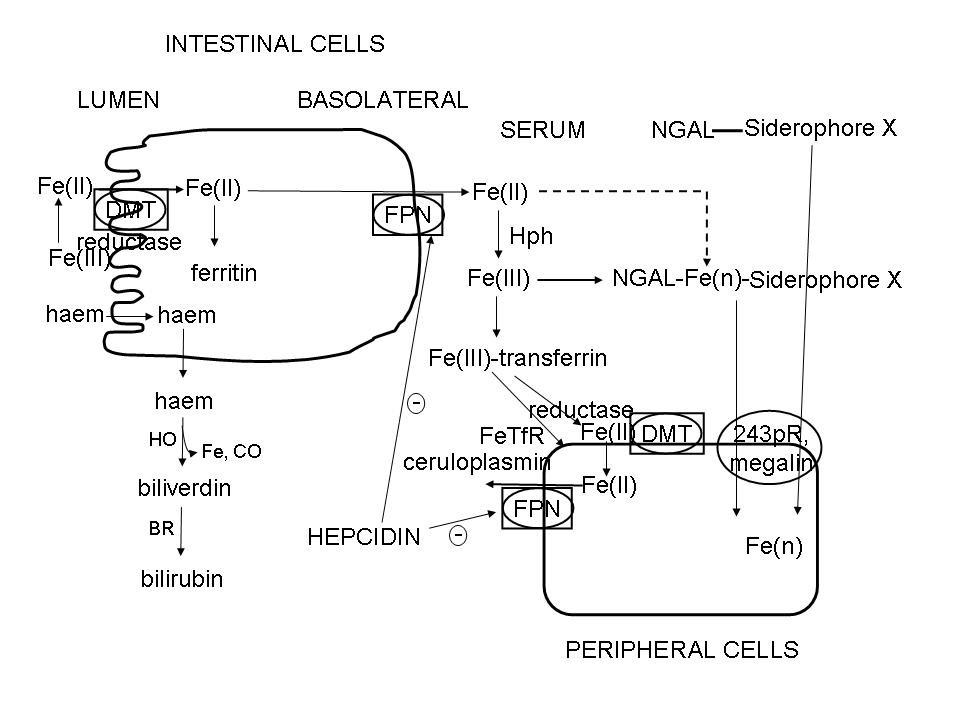
Diagram showing how hepcidin controls ferroportin levels, which in turn control entry of iron into the circulation

Hepcidin is a regulator of iron metabolism. It inhibits iron transport by binding to the iron export channel ferroportin which is located in the basolateral plasma membrane of gut enterocytes and the plasma membrane of reticuloendothelial cells (macrophages), ultimately resulting in ferroportin breakdown in lysosomes. It has been shown that hepcidin is able to bind to the central cavity of ferroportin, thus occluding iron export from the cell. This suggests that hepcidin is able to regulate iron export independently of ferroportin endocytosis and ubiquitination, and is thus quickly inducible and reversible.

In enterocytes, this prevents iron transmission into the hepatic portal system, thereby reducing dietary iron absorption. In macrophages, ferroportin inhibition causes iron be to stored within the cell. Increased hepcidin activity is partially responsible for reduced iron availability seen in anemia of chronic inflammation, such as kidney failure; this may explain why patients with end stage kidney failure may not respond to oral iron replacement.

Any one of several mutations in hepcidin will result in juvenile hemochromatosis. The majority of juvenile hemochromatosis cases are caused by mutations in hemojuvelin. Mutations in TMPRSS6 can cause anemia through dysregulation of hepcidin.

Hepcidin has strong antimicrobial activity against Escherichia coli strain ML35P and Neisseria cinerea and weaker antimicrobial activity against Staphylococcus epidermidis, Staphylococcus aureus and Streptococcus agalactiae. It is also active against the fungus Candida albicans, but has no activity against Pseudomonas aeruginosa.

== Regulation ==
Hepcidin creation (synthesis) and secretion by the liver is controlled by iron stores, inflammation (hepcidin is an acute phase reactant), hypoxia, and production of red blood cells (erythropoiesis). In response to large iron stores, production of bone morphogenic protein (BMP) is induced, which binds to receptors on hepatocytes and induces hepcidin expression via the SMAD pathway. Inflammation causes an increase in hepcidin production by releasing the signaling molecule interleukin-6 (IL-6), which binds to a receptor and upregulates the HAMP gene via the JAK/STAT pathway. Hypoxia negatively regulates hepcidin production via production the transcription factor hypoxia-inducible factor (HIF), which under normal conditions is degraded by von Hippel-Lindau (VHL) and prolyl dehydrogenase (PHD). However, when hypoxia is induced, PHD is inactivated, thus allowing HIF to down-regulate hepcidin production. Erythropoiesis decreases hepcidin production via production of erythropoietin (EPO), which has been shown to down-regulate hepcidin production.

Severe anemia is associated with low hepcidin levels, even in the presence of inflammation. Erythroferrone, produced in red blood cells (erythroblasts), has been identified as inhibiting hepcidin, thus providing more iron for hemoglobin synthesis in situations such as stress erythropoiesis.

Vitamin D has been shown to decrease hepcidin, both in cell models looking at transcription and when given in large doses to human volunteers. Optimal function of hepcidin may require adequate levels of vitamin D in the blood.

== History ==
Hepcidin was initially reported and named in January 1998, after it was observed that it was produced in the liver and appeared to have bactericidal (bacteria-killing) properties. Detailed descriptions were published in 2000–2001. Although it is primarily synthesized in the liver, smaller amounts are synthesized in other tissues such as fat cells.

Hepcidin was first discovered in human urine and blood serum. Soon after this discovery, researchers discovered that hepcidin production in mice increases in conditions of iron overload as well as inflammation. Genetically modified mice engineered to overexpress hepcidin died shortly after birth with severe iron deficiency, again suggesting that hepcidin plays a central and not redundant role in iron regulation.

The first piece of evidence that linked hepcidin to the clinical condition known as the anemia of inflammation came from the lab of Nancy Andrews in Boston, when researchers looked at tissue from two patients with liver tumors with a severe microcytic anemia that did not respond to iron supplements. The tumor tissue appeared to be overproducing hepcidin, and contained large quantities of hepcidin mRNA. Removing the tumors surgically cured the anemia.

Taken together, these discoveries suggested that hepcidin regulates the absorption of iron into the body.

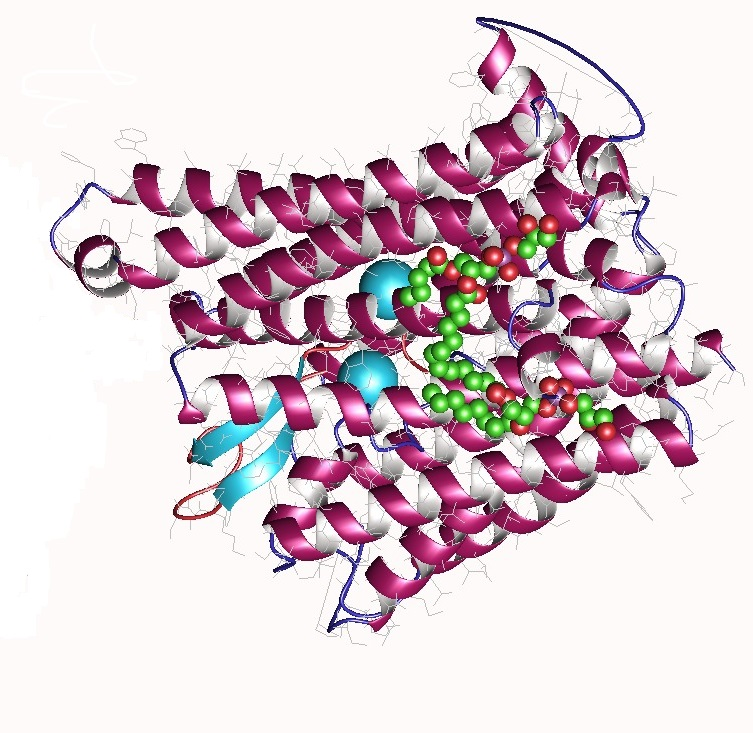
Hepcidin (blue) bound to the central cavity of ferroportin

== Clinical significance ==
There are many diseases where failure to adequately absorb iron contributes to iron deficiency and iron deficiency anemia. The treatment will depend on the hepcidin levels that are present, as oral treatment will be unlikely to be effective if hepcidin is blocking enteral absorption; in these cases, parenteral iron treatment would be appropriate. Studies have found that measuring hepcidin would help establish the optimal treatment for a patient, but as this is not widely available, C-reactive protein (CRP) is used as a surrogate marker.

Chronic alcohol consumption can lead to excess iron accumulation in the liver, which may contribute to the development of alcoholic liver disease. Chronic alcohol use may increase iron accumulation by inhibiting hepcidin gene expression. The main mechanisms appear to be increasing oxidative stress through its metabolite acetaldehyde, and by inhibiting the release of interleukin 6 (IL-6) from macrophages; each of these actions reduce the expression and DNA-binding activity of the transcription factor C/EBPα, which would otherwise stimulate hepcidin expression.

Beta thalassemia, one of the most common congenital anemias, arises from partial or complete failure to synthesize beta-globin, a component of hemoglobin. Excessive iron absorption is one of the main features of beta thalassemia and can lead to severe morbidity and mortality. The serial analyses of beta thalassemic mice indicate that hemoglobin levels decrease over time, while the concentration of iron in the liver, spleen, and kidneys increases significantly. The overload of iron is associated with low levels of hepcidin. Patients with beta thalassemia also have low hepcidin levels. The observations led researchers to hypothesize that more iron is absorbed in beta thalassemia than is required for erythropoiesis. Increasing expression of hepcidin in beta thalassemic mice limits iron overload, and also decreases formation of insoluble membrane-bound globins and reactive oxygen species, and improves anemia. Mice with increased hepcidin expression also demonstrated an increase in the lifespan of their red cells, reversal of ineffective erythropoiesis and splenomegaly, and an increase in total hemoglobin levels. From these data, researchers suggested that therapeutics to increase hepcidin levels or act as hepcidin agonists could help treat the abnormal iron absorption in individuals with beta thalassemia and related disorders. In later studies with mice, erythroferrone has been suggested to be the factor that is responsible for the hepcidin suppression. Correcting hepcidin and iron levels in these mice did not improve their anemia.
