= Erythropoiesis =

Process which produces red blood cells

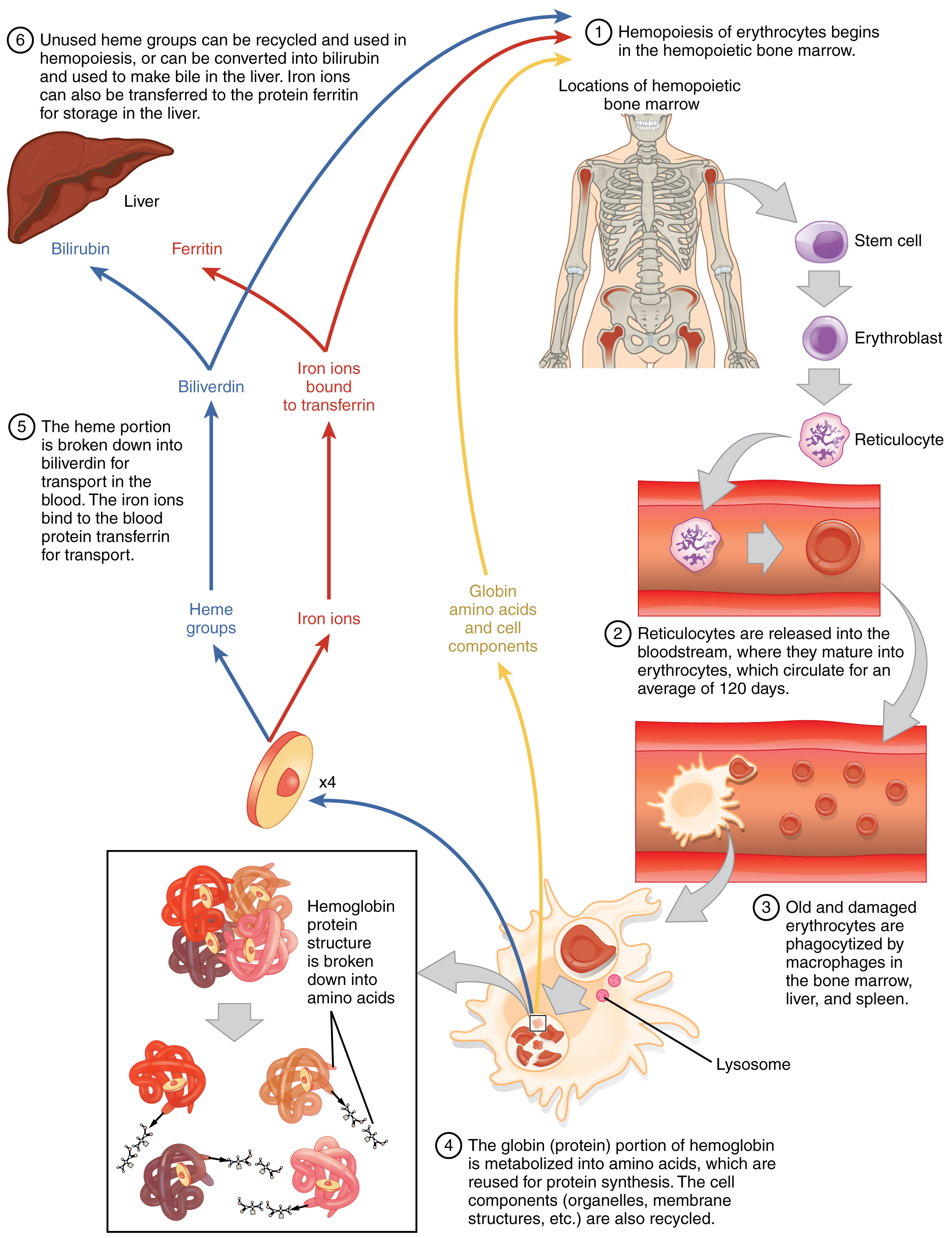
Life cycle of a red blood cell

Erythropoiesis (from Greek ἐρυθρός, erythros, meaning red, and ποίησις, poiēsis, meaning creation, production, making) is the process which produces red blood cells (erythrocytes), which is the development from erythropoietic stem cell to mature red blood cell.

It is stimulated by decreased O_{2} in circulation, which is detected by the kidneys, which then secrete the hormone erythropoietin. This hormone stimulates proliferation and differentiation of red cell precursors, which activates increased erythropoiesis in the hemopoietic tissues, ultimately producing red blood cells (erythrocytes). In postnatal birds and mammals (including humans), this usually occurs within the red bone marrow. In the early fetus, erythropoiesis takes place in the mesodermal cells of the yolk sac. By the third or fourth month, erythropoiesis moves to the liver. After seven months, erythropoiesis occurs in the bone marrow. Increased levels of physical activity can cause an increase in erythropoiesis. However, in humans with certain diseases and in some animals, erythropoiesis also occurs outside the bone marrow, within the spleen or liver. This is termed extramedullary erythropoiesis.

The bone marrow of essentially all the bones produces red blood cells until a person is around five years old. The tibia and femur cease to be important sites of hematopoiesis by about age 25; the vertebrae, sternum, pelvis and ribs, and cranial bones continue to produce red blood cells throughout life. Up to the age of 20 years, RBCs are produced from red bone marrow of all the bones (long bones and all the flat bones). After the age of 20 years, RBCs are produced from membranous bones such as vertebrae, the sternum, ribs, scapulas, and the iliac bones. After 20 years of age, the shaft of the long bones becomes yellow bone marrow because of fat deposition and loses the erythropoietic function.

Comparison of erythrocyte production by marrow stem cell lines from old and young adult donors shows no significant differences. This finding implies that little or none of the proliferative capacity of the erythropoietic stem cells is exhausted by a lifetime of normal functioning.

== Erythrocyte differentiation ==
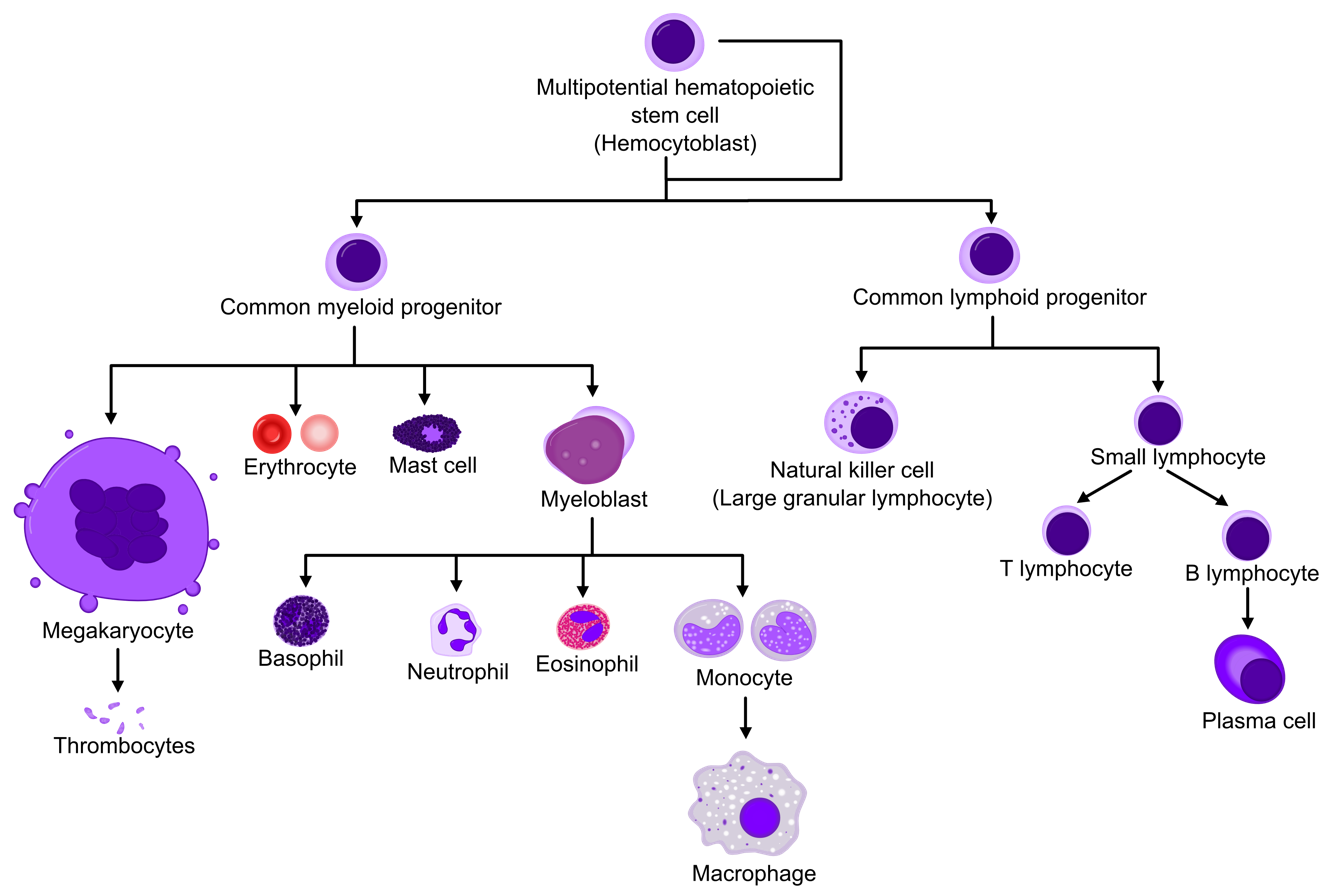
The various lineages of the multipotent hematopoietic stem cell (hemocytoblast).

In the process of red blood cell maturation, a cell undergoes a series of differentiations. The following stages of development all occur within the bone marrow:

1. The process begins with a hemocytoblast, also known as a multipotent hematopoietic stem cell. These cells regenerate independently, and the process at which they decide to commit to becoming a red blood cell over another type of blood cell is thought to be regulated by transcription factors that activate the genes necessary to become a red blood cell.
2. The hemocytoblast then becomes a multipotent progenitor cell.
3. The multipotent progenitor cell can either become a common myeloid progenitor (CMP) or a common lymphoid progenitor (CLP). CMPs are the cells that go on to become red blood cells as well as platelets, macrophages, monocytes, and granulocytes.
4. The common myeloid progenitor becomes a megakaryocyte/erythrocyte progenitor (MEP), which is the cell line that goes on to become red blood cells or platelets.
5. The first red blood cell precursor in the process of erythropoiesis is the pronormoblast (also commonly called a proerythroblast or a rubriblast). These are the largest of all the red blood cell precursors as the following cells decrease in size due to mitosis.
6. The pronormoblast becomes the basophilic or early normoblast (also commonly called an erythroblast).
7. The basopihilic normoblast becomes the polychromatophilic or intermediate normoblast.
8. This step marks the last stage of division, which leads to the formation of the orthochromatic or late normoblast.
9. At this stage the nucleus is expelled to form the reticulocyte. (These cells still contain RNA and are also called "immature red blood cells").

The cell is released from the bone marrow after Stage 8, and so in newly circulating red blood cells there are about 1% reticulocytes. After one to two days, these ultimately become "erythrocytes" or mature red blood cells.

These stages correspond to specific appearances of the cell when stained with Wright's stain and examined by light microscopy, and correspond to other biochemical changes.

In the process of maturation, a basophilic pronormoblast is converted from a cell with a large nucleus and a volume of 900 fL to an enucleated disc with a volume of 95 fL. By the reticulocyte stage, the cell has extruded its nucleus, but is still capable of producing hemoglobin.

Essential for the maturation of red blood cells are Vitamin B_{12} (cobalamin) and Vitamin B_{9} (folate). Cobalamin and folate are necessary for DNA synthesis, and deficiencies in either can impede mitosis, thus causing maturation failure in the process of erythropoiesis. This can lead to macrocytosis, where red blood cells are larger in size than average, or have an MCV greater than 100 fL. This also manifests clinically as reticulocytopenia, an abnormally low amount of reticulocytes.

== Characteristics seen in erythrocytes during erythropoiesis ==
As they mature, a number of erythrocyte characteristics change:

- The overall size of the erythroid precursor cell decreases, increasing the cytoplasmic to nucleus (C:N) ratio. The nuclear diameter decreases and chromatin condenses with the staining reaction progressing from purplish red to dark blue at the final nuclear stage of the orthochromatic erythroblast, prior to nuclear ejection.
- The colour of the cytoplasm changes from blue at proerythroblast and basophilic stages to a pinkish red as a result of the increasing expression of haemoglobin as the cell develops.
- The nucleus is initially large in size and contains open chromatin. As red blood cells mature, the size of the nucleus decreases, until it finally disappears with the condensation of the chromatin material.

== Mechanism of erythropoiesis ==
The production of all blood cells begins with the haemocytoblast, a multipotent haematopoietic stem cell. Haemocytoblasts have the greatest powers of self-renewal of any adult cell. They are found in the bone marrow and can be mobilised into the circulating blood when needed. Some haemocytoblasts differentiate into common myeloid progenitor cells, which go on to produce erythrocytes, as well as mast cells, megakaryocytes and myeloblasts. The process by which common myeloid progenitor cells become fully mature red blood cells involves several stages. First, they become normoblasts (aka erythroblasts), which are normally present in the bone marrow only. Then, they lose their nucleus as they mature into reticulocytes, which can be thought of as immature red blood cells. Some of these are released into the peripheral circulation. Finally, reticulocytes lose their remaining organelles as they mature into erythrocytes-which are fully mature red blood cells. The average lifespan of a red blood cell is approximately 120 days. During this maturation process, there is nuclear extrusion – i.e. mature erythrocytes have no nucleus. Nucleated red blood cells present in a sample of peripheral blood can indicate the release of incompletely developed cells. This can occur in pathology such as thalassaemia, severe anaemia or haematological malignancy.

== Regulation of erythropoiesis ==
A feedback loop involving erythropoietin helps regulate the process of erythropoiesis so that, in non-disease states, the production of red blood cells is equal to the destruction of red blood cells and the red blood cell number is sufficient to sustain adequate tissue oxygen levels but not so high as to cause sludging, thrombosis, or stroke. Erythropoietin is produced in the kidney and liver in response to low oxygen levels. In addition, erythropoietin is bound by circulating red blood cells; low circulating numbers lead to a relatively high level of unbound erythropoietin, which stimulates production in the bone marrow.

Recent studies have also shown that the peptide hormone hepcidin may play a role in the regulation of hemoglobin production, and thus affect erythropoiesis. The liver produces hepcidin. Hepcidin controls iron absorption in the gastrointestinal tract and iron release from reticuloendothelial tissue. Iron must be released from macrophages in the bone marrow to be incorporated into the heme group of hemoglobin in erythrocytes. There are colony forming units that the cells follow during their formation. These cells are referred to as the committed cells including the granulocyte monocyte colony forming units.

The secretion of hepcidin is inhibited by another hormone, erythroferrone, produced by erythroblasts in response to erythropoietin, and identified in 2014. It appears that this links erythropoietin-driven erythropoiesis with the iron mobilization needed for hemoglobin synthesis.

Loss of function of the erythropoietin receptor or JAK2 in mice cells causes failure in erythropoiesis, so production of red blood cells in embryos and growth is disrupted. If there is no systemic feedback inhibition, for example, the diminishment or absence of suppressors of cytokine signaling proteins, giantism may result as shown in mice models.

== Stress erythropoiesis ==
In addition to the steady state erythropoiesis, acute anemia probably stimulates another response which results in rapid development of new red blood cells. This has been studied in rats and happens in the liver through the activation of the BMP4-dependent stress erythropoiesis pathway.

== See also ==
- Anemia – a condition with an abnormally low level of functional hemoglobin
- Polycythemia – a condition with an abnormally high level of red blood cells
- Dyserythropoiesis – a problem with the development of red blood cells
