= Alessandro Di Fiore =

Italian entrepreneur (1965–2021)

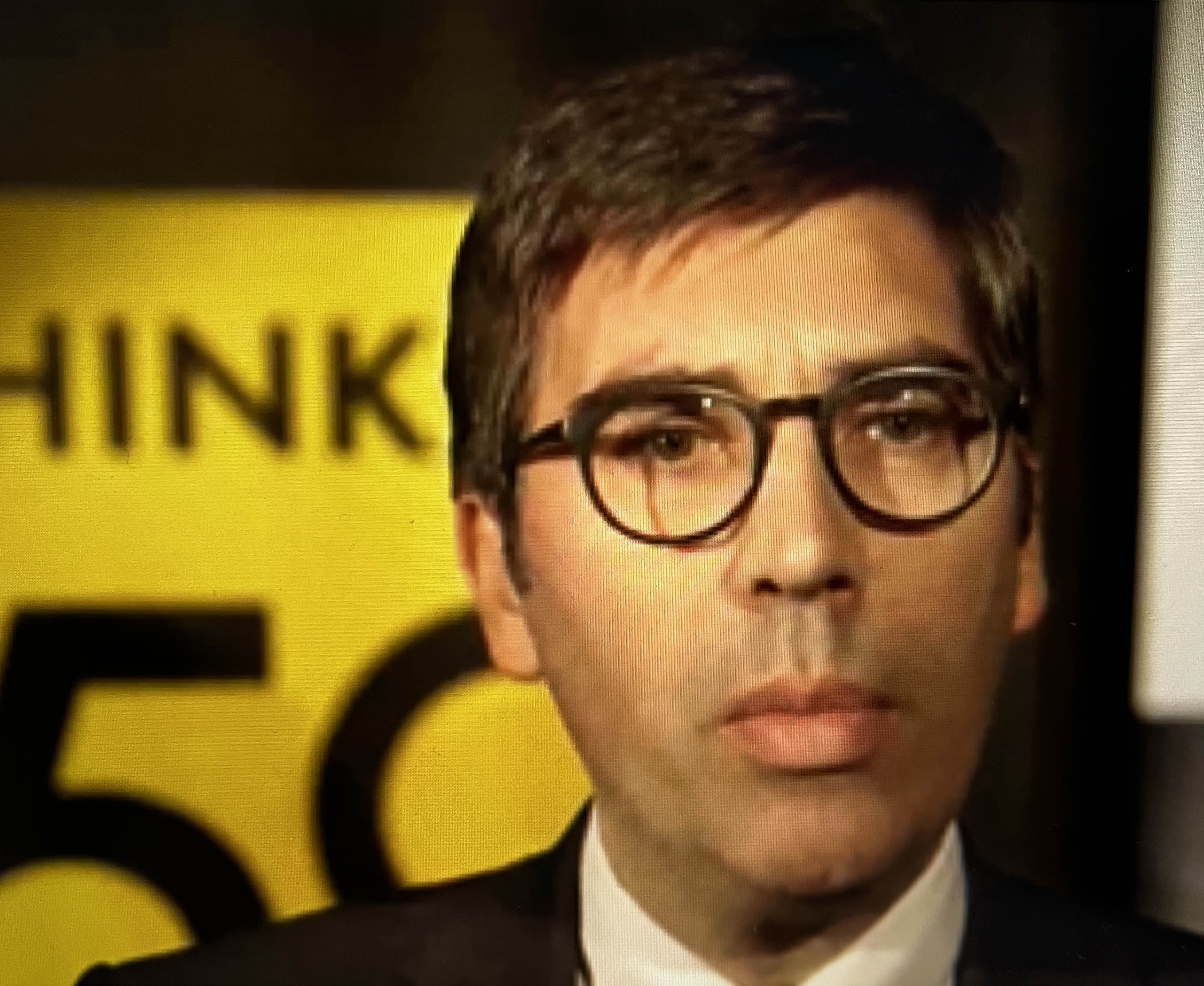
- Born: March 6, 1965; Naples, Italy
- Died: August 12, 2021 (aged 56); Rome, Italy
- Citizenship: Italy
- Occupation: Entrepreneur

Alessandro Di Fiore (Naples, March 6, 1965 – Rome, August 12, 2021) was an Italian entrepreneur, founder of ECSI, a consulting firm. He also served as the chairman of Harvard Business Review Italia. Di Fiore was best known for developing the “Insight-Driven” Organisation concept and writing the foreword to the book “Strategia Oceano Blu – Vincere senza Competere.”

== Early life and education ==
Di Fiore was born on 6 March 1965 in Naples, Italy. Later he acquired a master’s degree in Economics and Business Administration from Federico II University. He was also a student of Harvard Business School, where he studied Leadership under a President Program.

== Career ==
Di Fiore began his career in 1989 as a product manager at Colgate-Palmolive, where he was recognized in the YCMAD Global recognition program for contributing to the brand's success and making a difference to the organization at the age of 24. He then went on to work for Gemini Consulting where he was responsible for Life Sciences in continental Europe and then became a Managing Director for Italy, and worldwide director of its Market Focused Strategy Centre of Excellence.

Di Fiore started Venture Consulting in 2000. Tefen, a consulting firm listed on the Tel Aviv stock exchange, purchased the company in 2008. In 2010, Di Fiore founded the European Centre for Strategic Innovation. In 2017, ECSI was named one of the Top 5 Global Leaders.

Between 2013 and 2015, he was on the Board of Directors of SIGG Switzerland Bottles AG, a Swiss manufacturing company with headquarters in Frauenfeld, Switzerland. He was also a member of the Harvard Business Review worldwide editorial board.

He was also a member of YPO-WPO, the largest organization for CEOs and Presidents in the world, where he served on the board of the International Education Committee.

Di Fiore focused on the study and ideas on Insight-Driven Organization - IDO. He was also Senior Faculty of the Blue Ocean Institute and the Global Blue Ocean Network of INSEAD. He was a speaker at global conferences on topics like Organizational Agility, The Insight Driven Organization; Innovation Management; Business Model Innovation. Di Fiore was named in Thinkers50 Radar as one of the 30 international thinkers who could influence the future of companies and management.

== Selected articles ==
- Di Fiore, Alessandro and Souza, Marcio (2021). “Are Peer Reviews the Future of Performance Evaluations?”. Harvard Business Review.
- Di Fiore, Alessandro and Isenberg, Daniel (2020). “You don’t have to Pivot in a crisis”. Harvard Business Review
- Di Fiore, Alessandro; West, Kendra; Segnalini, Andrea (2019). “Why Science – Driven companies should use Agile”. Harvard Business Review.
- Di Fiore, Alessandro (2018). “Planning doesn’t have to be the enemy of Agile”.
- Di Fiore, Alessandro and Marshall Van Alstyne and Simon Schneider (2017). “4 Mistakes that Kill Crowdsourcing Efforts”. Harvard Business Review.
- Di Fiore, Alessandro (2017).“3D Printing gives Hackers entirely new ways to wreak havoc”. Harvard Business Review.
- Di Fiore, Alessandro; Vetter, Jonas; Capur, Devan (2016). “Collaborative Innovation: how to avoid the four traps”. Harvard Business Review.
- Di Fiore, Alessandro; Farri, Elisa; Rosani, Gabriele (2014). “You can’t collaborate unless you agree on the problem”. Harvard Business Review.
- Di Fiore, Alessandro (2013).“Implementing Innovation: segment your non-customers”. Harvard Business Review.
- Di Fiore, Alessandro (2012). “Strategic Insight is Not on the CEO Radar”. Harvard Business Review.
- Di Fiore, Alessandro (2011). “A different premium brand strategy”. Harvard Business Review.
- Di Fiore, Alessandro (2010). “Creating Michelin-star quality for the masses”. Harvard Business Review.

== Selected conferences ==
- Di Fiore, Alessandro (2021). “How to Design an Ecosystem”. Innov8rs.
- Di Fiore, Alessandro (2020). “Enabling an Insight Driven Organisation Webinar”. GLG.
- Di Fiore, Alessandro (2015). "You Cannot Collaborate unless You Agree on the Problem". HBS Webinar on Co-creation.

== Personal life ==
In 1991, Di Fiore married Letizia and the couple had a son named Leonardo.

Di Fiore was diagnosed with polycythemia vera in 1992, which progressed to myelofibrosis in April 2016 and he died on August 12, 2021, at the age of 56, from complications related to his bone marrow transplant.
