= Iron in biology =

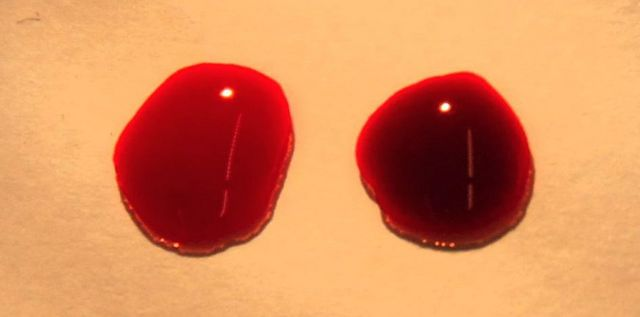
Iron in hemoglobin is the source of the red coloration of vertebrate blood.

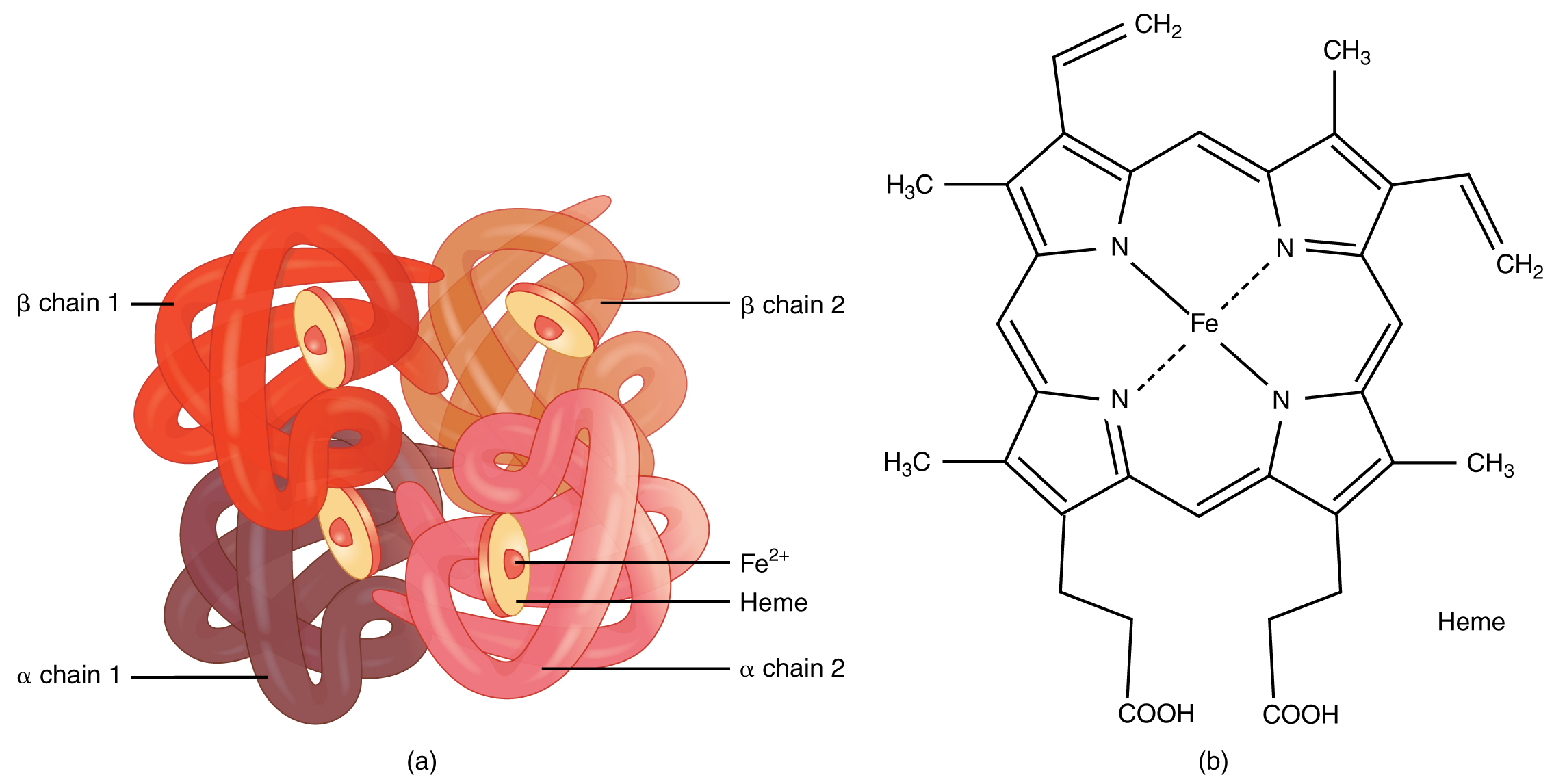
Hemoglobin diagram

Iron is an important biological element. It is used in both the ubiquitous iron-sulfur proteins and in vertebrates it is used in hemoglobin which is essential for blood and oxygen transport.

== Overview ==
Iron is required for life. The iron–sulfur clusters are pervasive and include nitrogenase, the enzymes responsible for biological nitrogen fixation. Iron-containing proteins participate in transport, storage and use of oxygen. Iron proteins are involved in electron transfer. The ubiquity of Iron in life has led to the Iron–sulfur world hypothesis that iron was a central component of the environment of early life.

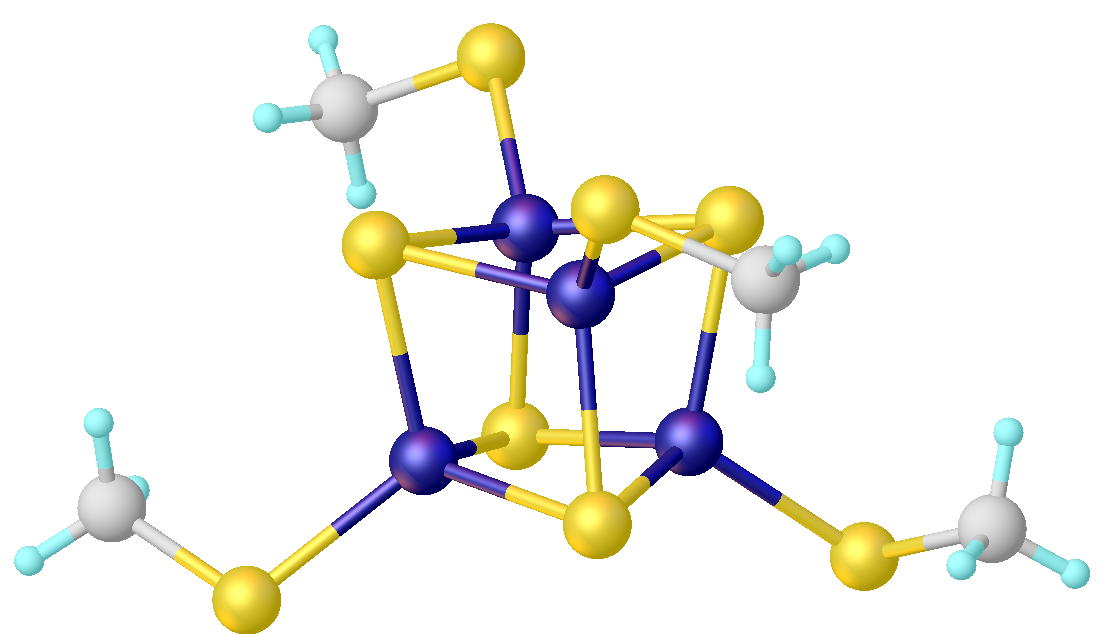
An Iron–sulfur cluster.

Structure of Heme b; in the protein additional ligand(s) would be attached to Fe.

Examples of iron-containing proteins in higher organisms include hemoglobin, cytochrome (see high-valent iron), and catalase. The average adult human contains about 0.005% body weight of iron, or about four grams, of which three quarters is in hemoglobin – a level that remains constant despite only about one milligram of iron being absorbed each day, because the human body recycles its hemoglobin for the iron content.

Microbial growth may be assisted by oxidation of iron(II) or by reduction of iron (III).

=== Biochemistry ===
Iron acquisition poses a problem for aerobic organisms because ferric iron is poorly soluble near neutral pH. Thus, these organisms have developed means to absorb iron as complexes, sometimes taking up ferrous iron before oxidising it back to ferric iron. In particular, bacteria have evolved very high-affinity sequestering agents called siderophores.

After uptake in human cells, iron storage is precisely regulated. A major component of this regulation is the protein transferrin, which binds iron ions absorbed from the duodenum and carries it in the blood to cells. Transferrin contains Fe^{3+} in the middle of a distorted octahedron, bonded to one nitrogen, three oxygens and a chelating carbonate anion that traps the Fe^{3+} ion: it has such a high stability constant that it is very effective at taking up Fe^{3+} ions even from the most stable complexes. At the bone marrow, transferrin is reduced from Fe^{3+} and Fe^{2+} and stored as ferritin to be incorporated into hemoglobin.

The most commonly known and studied bioinorganic iron compounds (biological iron molecules) are the heme proteins: examples are hemoglobin, myoglobin, and cytochrome P450. These compounds participate in transporting gases, building enzymes, and transferring electrons. Metalloproteins are a group of proteins with metal ion cofactors. Some examples of iron metalloproteins are ferritin and rubredoxin. Many enzymes vital to life contain iron, such as catalase, lipoxygenases, and IRE-BP.

Hemoglobin is an oxygen carrier that occurs in red blood cells and contributes their color, transporting oxygen in the arteries from the lungs to the muscles where it is transferred to myoglobin, which stores it until it is needed for the metabolic oxidation of glucose, generating energy. Here the hemoglobin binds to carbon dioxide, produced when glucose is oxidized, which is transported through the veins by hemoglobin (predominantly as bicarbonate anions) back to the lungs where it is exhaled. In hemoglobin, the iron is in one of four heme groups and has six possible coordination sites; four are occupied by nitrogen atoms in a porphyrin ring, the fifth by an imidazole nitrogen in a histidine residue of one of the protein chains attached to the heme group, and the sixth is reserved for the oxygen molecule it can reversibly bind to. When hemoglobin is not attached to oxygen (and is then called deoxyhemoglobin), the Fe^{2+} ion at the center of the heme group (in the hydrophobic protein interior) is in a high-spin configuration. It is thus too large to fit inside the porphyrin ring, which bends instead into a dome with the Fe^{2+} ion about 55 picometers above it. In this configuration, the sixth coordination site reserved for the oxygen is blocked by another histidine residue.

When deoxyhemoglobin picks up an oxygen molecule, this histidine residue moves away and returns once the oxygen is securely attached to form a hydrogen bond with it. This results in the Fe^{2+} ion switching to a low-spin configuration, resulting in a 20% decrease in ionic radius so that now it can fit into the porphyrin ring, which becomes planar. (Additionally, this hydrogen bonding results in the tilting of the oxygen molecule, resulting in a Fe–O–O bond angle of around 120° that avoids the formation of Fe–O–Fe or Fe–O_{2}–Fe bridges that would lead to electron transfer, the oxidation of Fe^{2+} to Fe^{3+}, and the destruction of hemoglobin.) This results in a movement of all the protein chains that leads to the other subunits of hemoglobin changing shape to a form with larger oxygen affinity. Thus, when deoxyhemoglobin takes up oxygen, its affinity for more oxygen increases, and vice versa. Myoglobin, on the other hand, contains only one heme group and hence this cooperative effect cannot occur. Thus, while hemoglobin is almost saturated with oxygen in the high partial pressures of oxygen found in the lungs, its affinity for oxygen is much lower than that of myoglobin, which oxygenates even at low partial pressures of oxygen found in muscle tissue. As described by the Bohr effect (named after Christian Bohr, the father of Niels Bohr), the oxygen affinity of hemoglobin diminishes in the presence of carbon dioxide.

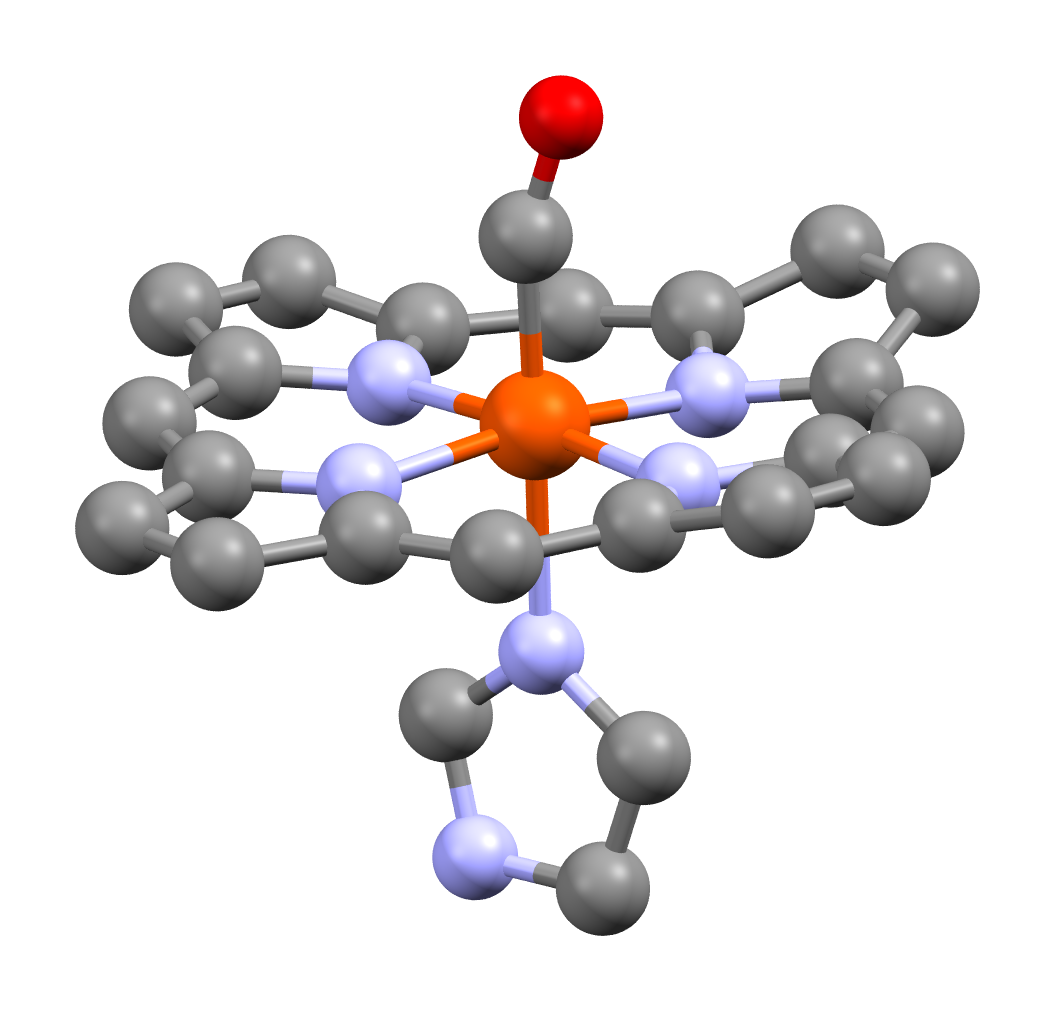
A heme unit of human carboxyhemoglobin, showing the carbonyl ligand at the apical position, trans to the histidine residue

Carbon monoxide and phosphorus trifluoride are poisonous to humans because they bind to hemoglobin similarly to oxygen, but with much more strength, so that oxygen can no longer be transported throughout the body. Hemoglobin bound to carbon monoxide is known as carboxyhemoglobin. This effect also plays a minor role in the toxicity of cyanide, but there the major effect is by far its interference with the proper functioning of the electron transport protein cytochrome a. The cytochrome proteins also involve heme groups and are involved in the metabolic oxidation of glucose by oxygen. The sixth coordination site is then occupied by either another imidazole nitrogen or a methionine sulfur, so that these proteins are largely inert to oxygen – with the exception of cytochrome a, which bonds directly to oxygen and thus is very easily poisoned by cyanide. Here, the electron transfer takes place as the iron remains in low spin but changes between the +2 and +3 oxidation states. Since the reduction potential of each step is slightly greater than the previous one, the energy is released step-by-step and can thus be stored in adenosine triphosphate. Cytochrome a is slightly distinct, as it occurs at the mitochondrial membrane, binds directly to oxygen, and transports protons as well as electrons, as follows:

4 Cytc^{2+} + O_{2} + 8H^{+}_{inside} → 4 Cytc^{3+} + 2 H_{2}O + 4H^{+}_{outside}

Although the heme proteins are the most important class of iron-containing proteins, the iron–sulfur proteins are also very important, being involved in electron transfer, which is possible since iron can exist stably in either the +2 or +3 oxidation states. These have one, two, four, or eight iron atoms that are each approximately tetrahedrally coordinated to four sulfur atoms; because of this tetrahedral coordination, they always have high-spin iron. The simplest of such compounds is rubredoxin, which has only one iron atom coordinated to four sulfur atoms from cysteine residues in the surrounding peptide chains. Another important class of iron–sulfur proteins is the ferredoxins, which have multiple iron atoms. Transferrin does not belong to either of these classes.

The ability of sea mussels to maintain their grip on rocks in the ocean is facilitated by their use of organometallic iron-based bonds in their protein-rich cuticles. Based on synthetic replicas, the presence of iron in these structures increased elastic modulus 770 times, tensile strength 58 times, and toughness 92 times. The amount of stress required to permanently damage them increased 76 times.

== Vertebrate metabolism ==
In vertebrates, iron is an essential component of hemoglobin, the oxygen transport protein. A 2024 article reviewed iron metabolism and its interactions with calcium, magnesium, and selected trace elements (copper, zinc, lead, cadmium, mercury, and nickel), as well as their roles in certain diseases.

=== Human body iron stores ===
Illustration of blood cell production in the bone marrow. In iron deficiency, the bone marrow produces fewer blood cells, and as the deficiency gets worse, the cells become smaller.

Most well-nourished people in industrialized countries have 4 to 5 grams of iron in their bodies (~38 mg iron/kg body weight for women and ~50 mg iron/kg body for men). Of this, about 2.5 g is contained in the hemoglobin needed to carry oxygen through the blood (around 0.5 mg of iron per mL of blood), and most of the rest (approximately 2 grams in adult men, and somewhat less in women of childbearing age) is contained in ferritin complexes that are present in all cells, but most common in bone marrow, liver, and spleen. The liver stores of ferritin are the primary physiologic source of reserve iron in the body. The reserves of iron in industrialized countries tend to be lower in children and women of child-bearing age than in men and in the elderly. Women who must use their stores to compensate for iron lost through menstruation, pregnancy or lactation have lower non-hemoglobin body stores, which may consist of 500 mg, or even less.

Of the body's total iron content, about 400 mg is devoted to cellular proteins that use iron for important cellular processes like storing oxygen (myoglobin) or performing energy-producing redox reactions (cytochromes). A relatively small amount (3–4 mg) circulates through the plasma, bound to transferrin. Because of its toxicity, free soluble iron is kept in low concentration in the body.

Iron deficiency first affects the storage of iron in the body, and depletion of these stores is thought to be relatively asymptomatic, although some vague and non-specific symptoms have been associated with it. Since iron is primarily required for hemoglobin, iron deficiency anemia is the primary clinical manifestation of iron deficiency. Iron-deficient people will suffer or die from organ damage well before their cells run out of the iron needed for intracellular processes like electron transport.

Macrophages of the reticuloendothelial system store iron as part of the process of breaking down and processing hemoglobin from engulfed red blood cells. Iron is also stored as a pigment called hemosiderin, which is an ill-defined deposit of protein and iron, created by macrophages where excess iron is present, either locally or systemically, e.g., among people with iron overload due to frequent blood cell destruction and the necessary transfusions their condition calls for. If systemic iron overload is corrected, over time the hemosiderin is slowly resorbed by the macrophages.

=== Mechanisms of iron regulation ===
Human iron homeostasis is regulated at two different levels. Systemic iron levels are balanced by the controlled absorption of dietary iron by enterocytes, the cells that line the interior of the intestines, and the uncontrolled loss of iron from epithelial sloughing, sweat, injuries and blood loss. In addition, systemic iron is continuously recycled. Cellular iron levels are controlled differently by different cell types due to the expression of particular iron regulatory and transport proteins.

==== Systemic iron regulation ====
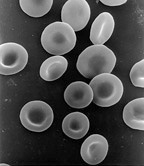
Humans use 20 mg of iron each day for the production of new red blood cells, much of which is recycled from old red blood cells.

===== Dietary iron uptake =====
The absorption of dietary iron is a variable and dynamic process. The amount of iron absorbed compared to the amount ingested is typically low, but may range from 5% to as much as 35% depending on circumstances and type of iron. The efficiency with which iron is absorbed varies depending on the source. Generally, the best-absorbed forms of iron come from animal products. Absorption of dietary iron in iron salt form (as in most supplements) varies somewhat according to the body's need for iron, and is usually between 10% and 20% of iron intake. Absorption of iron from animal products, and some plant products, is in the form of heme iron, and is more efficient, allowing absorption of from 15% to 35% of intake. Heme iron in animals is from blood and heme-containing proteins in meat and mitochondria, whereas in plants, heme iron is present in mitochondria in all cells that use oxygen for respiration.

Like most mineral nutrients, the majority of the iron absorbed from digested food or supplements is absorbed in the duodenum by enterocytes of the duodenal lining. These cells have special molecules that allow them to move iron into the body. To be absorbed, dietary iron can be absorbed as part of a protein such as heme protein or iron must be in its ferrous Fe^{2+} form. A ferric reductase enzyme on the enterocytes' brush border, duodenal cytochrome B (Dcytb), reduces ferric Fe^{3+} to Fe^{2+}. A protein called divalent metal transporter 1 (DMT1), which can transport several divalent metals across the plasma membrane, then transports iron across the enterocyte's cell membrane into the cell. If the iron is bound to heme it is instead transported across the apical membrane by heme carrier protein 1 (HCP1).

These intestinal lining cells can then either store the iron as ferritin, which is accomplished by Fe^{2+} binding to apoferritin (in which case the iron will leave the body when the cell dies and is sloughed off into feces), or the cell can release it into the body via the only known iron exporter in mammals, ferroportin. Hephaestin, a ferroxidase that can oxidize Fe^{2+} to Fe^{3+} and is found mainly in the small intestine, helps ferroportin transfer iron across the basolateral end of the intestine cells. In contrast, ferroportin is post-translationally repressed by hepcidin, a 25-amino acid peptide hormone. The body regulates iron levels by regulating each of these steps. For instance, enterocytes synthesize more Dcytb, DMT1 and ferroportin in response to iron deficiency anemia. Iron absorption from diet is enhanced in the presence of vitamin C and diminished by excess calcium, zinc, or manganese.

The human body's rate of iron absorption appears to respond to a variety of interdependent factors, including total iron stores, the extent to which the bone marrow is producing new red blood cells, the concentration of hemoglobin in the blood, and the oxygen content of the blood. The body also absorbs less iron during times of inflammation, in order to deprive bacteria of iron. Recent discoveries demonstrate that hepcidin regulation of ferroportin is responsible for the syndrome of anemia of chronic disease.

===== Iron recycling and loss =====
Most of the iron in the body is hoarded and recycled by the reticuloendothelial system, which breaks down aged red blood cells. In contrast to iron uptake and recycling, there is no physiologic regulatory mechanism for excreting iron. People lose a small but steady amount by gastrointestinal blood loss, sweating and by shedding cells of the skin and the mucosal lining of the gastrointestinal tract. The total amount of loss for healthy people in the developed world amounts to an estimated average of 1 mg a day for men, and 1.5–2 mg a day for women with regular menstrual periods. People with gastrointestinal parasitic infections, more commonly found in developing countries, often lose more. Those who cannot regulate absorption well enough get disorders of iron overload. In these diseases, the toxicity of iron starts overwhelming the body's ability to bind and store it.

==== Cellular iron regulation ====
===== Iron import =====
Most cell types take up iron primarily through receptor-mediated endocytosis via transferrin receptor 1 (TFR1), transferrin receptor 2 (TFR2) and GAPDH. TFR1 has a 30-fold higher affinity for transferrin-bound iron than TFR2 and thus is the main player in this process. The higher order multifunctional glycolytic enzyme glyceraldehyde-3-phosphate dehydrogenase (GAPDH) also acts as a transferrin receptor. Transferrin-bound ferric iron is recognized by these transferrin receptors, triggering a conformational change that causes endocytosis. Iron then enters the cytoplasm from the endosome via importer DMT1 after being reduced to its ferrous state by a STEAP family reductase.

Alternatively, iron can enter the cell directly via plasma membrane divalent cation importers such as DMT1 and ZIP14 (Zrt-Irt-like protein 14). Again, iron enters the cytoplasm in the ferrous state after being reduced in the extracellular space by a reductase such as STEAP2, STEAP3 (in red blood cells), Dcytb (in enterocytes) and SDR2.

===== The labile iron pool =====
In the cytoplasm, ferrous iron is found in a soluble, chelatable state which constitutes the labile iron pool (~0.001 mM). In this pool, iron is thought to be bound to low-mass compounds such as peptides, carboxylates and phosphates, although some might be in a free, hydrated form (aqua ions). Alternatively, iron ions might be bound to specialized proteins known as metallochaperones. Specifically, poly-r(C)-binding proteins PCBP1 and PCBP2 appear to mediate transfer of free iron to ferritin (for storage) and non-heme iron enzymes (for use in catalysis). The labile iron pool is potentially toxic due to iron's ability to generate reactive oxygen species. Iron from this pool can be taken up by mitochondria via mitoferrin to synthesize Fe-S clusters and heme groups.

===== The storage iron pool =====
Iron can be stored in ferritin as ferric iron due to the ferroxidase activity of the ferritin heavy chain. Dysfunctional ferritin may accumulate as hemosiderin, which can be problematic in cases of iron overload. The ferritin storage iron pool is much larger than the labile iron pool, ranging in concentration from 0.7 mM to 3.6 mM.

===== Iron export =====
Iron export occurs in a variety of cell types, including neurons, red blood cells, macrophages and enterocytes. The latter two are especially important since systemic iron levels depend upon them. There is only one known iron exporter, ferroportin. It transports ferrous iron out of the cell, generally aided by ceruloplasmin and/or hephaestin (mostly in enterocytes), which oxidize iron to its ferric state so it can bind ferritin in the extracellular medium. Hepcidin causes the internalization of ferroportin, decreasing iron export. Besides, hepcidin seems to downregulate both TFR1 and DMT1 through an unknown mechanism. Another player assisting ferroportin in effecting cellular iron export is GAPDH. A specific post translationally modified isoform of GAPDH is recruited to the surface of iron loaded cells where it recruits apo-transferrin in close proximity to ferroportin so as to rapidly chelate the iron extruded.

The expression of hepcidin, which only occurs in certain cell types such as hepatocytes, is tightly controlled at the transcriptional level and it represents the link between cellular and systemic iron homeostasis due to hepcidin's role as "gatekeeper" of iron release from enterocytes into the rest of the body. Erythroblasts produce erythroferrone, a hormone which inhibits hepcidin and so increases the availability of iron needed for hemoglobin synthesis.

===== Translational control of cellular iron =====
Although some control exists at the transcriptional level, the regulation of cellular iron levels is ultimately controlled at the translational level by iron-responsive element-binding proteins IRP1 and especially IRP2. When iron levels are low, these proteins are able to bind to iron-responsive elements (IREs). IREs are stem loop structures in the untranslated regions (UTRs) of mRNA.

Both ferritin and ferroportin contain an IRE in their 5' UTRs, so that under iron deficiency their translation is repressed by IRP2, preventing the unnecessary synthesis of storage protein and the detrimental export of iron. In contrast, TFR1 and some DMT1 variants contain 3' UTR IREs, which bind IRP2 under iron deficiency, stabilizing the mRNA, which guarantees the synthesis of iron importers.

== Marine systems ==
Iron plays an essential role in marine systems and can act as a limiting nutrient for planktonic activity. Because of this, too much of a decrease in iron may lead to a decrease in growth rates in phytoplanktonic organisms such as diatoms. Iron can also be oxidized by marine microbes under conditions that are high in iron and low in oxygen.

Iron can enter marine systems through adjoining rivers and directly from the atmosphere. Once iron enters the ocean, it can be distributed throughout the water column through ocean mixing and through recycling on the cellular level. In the arctic, sea ice plays a major role in the store and distribution of iron in the ocean, depleting oceanic iron as it freezes in the winter and releasing it back into the water when thawing occurs in the summer. The iron cycle can fluctuate the forms of iron from aqueous to particle forms altering the availability of iron to primary producers. Increased light and warmth increases the amount of iron that is in forms that are usable by primary producers.

== See also ==
- Scaly-foot gastropod – Deep-sea gastropod known to incorporate iron into its exoskeleton
