= Hephaestin =

Mammalian protein found in Homo sapiens

HEPH

Identifiers
- Aliases: HEPH, CPL, hephaestin, Hephaestin
- External IDs: OMIM: 300167; MGI: 1332240; GeneCards: HEPH
Enzyme activity
EC #	BRENDA	ExPASy	KEGG	MetaCyc
1.16.3.1	↗	↗	↗	↗

Gene location (Human)
Chr.	X chromosome (human)
Band	Xq12	Start	66,162,549 bp
Band	Xq12	End	66,268,867 bp

Gene location (Mouse)
Chr.	X chromosome (mouse)
Band	X C3|X 42.69 cM	Start	95,498,965 bp
Band	X C3|X 42.69 cM	End	95,618,091 bp
RNA expression pattern
Bgee	Human / Mouse (ortholog); Top expressed in: jejunal mucosa; mucosa of sigmoid colon; mucosa of ileum; rectum; duodenum; transverse colon; Descending thoracic aorta; optic nerve; mucosa of transverse colon; smooth muscle tissue / Top expressed in: ileum; left colon; epithelium of small intestine; jejunum; molar; seminal vesicula; vas deferens; intestinal villus; duodenum; migratory enteric neural crest cell; More reference expression data
BioGPS	n/a
Gene ontology
Molecular function	oxidoreductase activity; ferrous iron binding; copper ion binding; metal ion binding; ferroxidase activity; oxidoreductase activity, acting on metal ions
Cellular component	perinuclear region of cytoplasm; integral component of membrane; plasma membrane; basolateral plasma membrane; intracellular anatomical structure; membrane; extracellular space
Biological process	copper ion transport; iron ion homeostasis; iron ion transport; ion transport; cellular iron ion homeostasis
Sources:Amigo / QuickGO
Orthologs
Databases	NCBI: entry; OMA: entry
Species	Human	Mouse
Entrez	9843	15203
Ensembl	ENSG00000089472	ENSMUSG00000031209
UniProt	Q9BQS7	Q9Z0Z4
RefSeq (mRNA)	NM_001130860; NM_001282141; NM_014799; NM_138737	NM_001159627; NM_001159628; NM_010417; NM_181273
RefSeq (protein)	NP_001124332; NP_001269070; NP_055614; NP_620074; NP_001354161 NP_001354162; NP_001354163; NP_001354165; NP_001354167; NP_001354168; NP_001354169; NP_001354170; NP_001354171; NP_001354172	NP_001153099; NP_001153100; NP_034547; NP_851790
Location (UCSC)	Chr X: 66.16 – 66.27 Mb	Chr X: 95.5 – 95.62 Mb
PubMed search
- Wikidata
View/Edit Human	View/Edit Mouse

Hephaestin, also known as HEPH, is a protein which in humans is encoded by the HEPH gene.

== Function ==
Hephaestin is involved in the metabolism and homeostasis of iron and possibly copper. It is a transmembrane copper-dependent ferroxidase responsible for transporting dietary iron from intestinal enterocytes into the circulatory system. The highest expression of hephaestin is found in small intestine. It is limited to enterocytes of the villi (where the iron absorption takes place), being almost absent in crypt cells. Hephaestin converts iron(II) state, Fe^{2+}, to iron(III) state, Fe^{3+}, and mediates iron efflux most likely in cooperation with the basolateral iron transporter, ferroportin 1. To a lesser extent hephaestin has been detected in colon, spleen, kidney, breast, placenta and bone trabecular cells but its role in these tissues remains to be established. Hephaestin presents homology with ceruloplasmin, a serum dehydrogenase protein involved in copper detoxification and storage.

Hephaestin is a protein of 1135 aminoacids formed from a precursor of 1158 aminoacids and is 130.4 kDa. It is predicted to bind 6 copper ions per monomer.

== Discovery ==
Hephaestin was first identified by Dr. Christopher D. Vulpe of the University of California, Berkeley in 1999. They named the newfound protein after Hephaestus, the Greek god of metal working.

Much of what is known about hephaestin comes from studying heritable mutants of murine iron metabolism. The protein was discovered and identified through the study of mice with sex-linked anemia, or sla mice, in which there is normal mucosal uptake of dietary iron but impaired transport of iron from the intestinal enterocytes into the circulation. sla mice harbor a partial deletion mutation of the HEPH gene, resulting in the expression of a hephaestin protein that is truncated by 194 amino acids. Studies suggest that this truncated hephaestin protein still retains a minimal, yet detectable and quantifiable level of ferroxidase activity. This raises the possibility that alternative factors may contribute to the decreased efflux of iron seen in the sla phenotype.

In addition to the truncation of the original protein, the iron-deficient sla phenotype may also be explained by the intracellular mislocalization of hephaestin. Wild type hephaestin localizes in a supra nuclear compartment as well as the basolateral surface. In contrast, sla hephaestin seems to localize only in the supranuclear compartment but is largely undetectable in the latter. Given hephaestin's established function in facilitating basolateral iron export, this mislocalization may explain the paradoxical intestinal iron accumulation and systemic iron deficiency observed in sla mice.

Human hephaestin, lacking the putative transmembrane domain, was first recombinantly expressed in 2005 by Drs. Tanya Griffiths, Grant Mauk, and Ross MacGillivray at the University of British Columbia. They demonstrated that recombinant human hephaestin (rhHp) bound copper (determined by inductively coupled plasma mass spectrometry) and exhibited an absorption maximum at ~610 nm consistent with other blue multicopper oxidases such as ceruloplasmin. By using ferrous ammonium sulfate as a substrate, rhHp was shown to have ferroxidase activity with a K_{m} of 2.1 μM for Fe(II).

== Structure ==
Hephaestin is a member of the family of copper oxidases that includes mammalian ceruloplasmin, yeast fet3 and fet5, and bacterial ascorbate oxidase, among others. While hephaestin shares 50% amino acid sequence identity with its serum homologue ceruloplasmin, the hephaestin protein includes an additional 86 amino acids at the C-terminus, which code for a single transmembrane domain and a short cytoplasmic tail. While the structure and kinetic activity of ceruloplasmin have been studied extensively, hephaestin has yet to be investigated at a similar level. Comparative models of hephaestin's structure have been created using established crystallographic data from ceruloplasmin, and these studies suggest that many of the structural features important in the enzymatic function of the latter are also conserved in the former. In particular, these shared features include cysteine residues involved in disulfide bond formation, histidine residues involved in copper binding, and residues involved in the binding of the iron substrate.

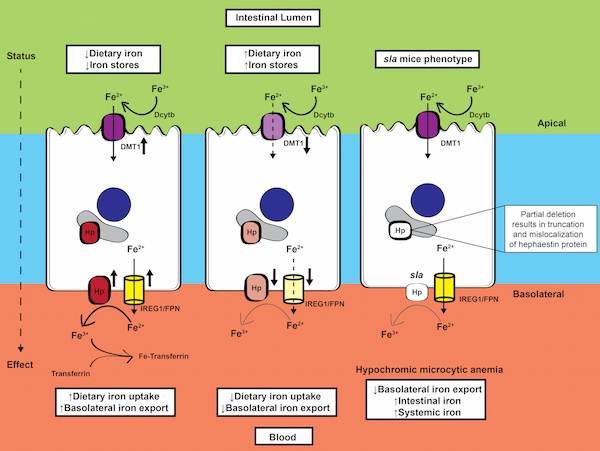
Proposed regulation of expression of hephaestin in response to varying iron uptake and stores. Hephaestin is thought to be both structurally modified and mislocalized in sla mice.

== Regulation ==
The regulation of hephaestin expression and the protein's role in the larger picture of iron metabolism and homeostasis remain an active area of research. Some studies suggest mechanisms for local and systemic control of intestinal iron transport, in which high dietary iron intake and sufficient iron stores lead to down-regulation of DMT1, ferroportin (Ireg1) and hephaestin protein, thus minimizing iron absorption from the enterocytes into the circulation. Conversely, it is suggested that states of low dietary intake and low iron stores induce up-regulation of DMT1 as well as Ireg1 and hephaestin, thus simultaneously increasing the enterocyte's capacity for dietary iron uptake on the basolateral surface and export into the circulation on the apical surface.

== Relevance in biology and disease ==
Hephaestin has not yet been linked to a human disease. However, when the protein was ablated in murine models, both intestine-specific and whole-body hephaestin knockout (KO) strains exhibited similarly severe accumulation of iron in the duodenal enterocytes and suffered from microcytic, hypochromic anemia, indicative of systemic iron deficiency. The shared phenotype between the two strains suggests that intestinal hephaestin plays an important role in maintaining whole-body iron homeostasis. However, since both strains were viable, it is likely that hephaestin is not essential and other compensatory mechanisms exist to keep these mice alive.

In addition to the transport of iron from the intestine and into the circulation, ferroxidases also seem to play an important role in facilitating iron export from retinal cells. While deficiency in hephaestin or ceruloplasmin alone do not seem to cause iron buildup in the retina, studies done on murine models suggest that the combined deficiency is sufficient to cause age-dependent retinal pigment epithelium and retinal iron accumulation, with features consistent with macular degeneration. Hephaestin has been detected in mouse and human RPE (retinal pigment epithelial) cells as well as in rMC-1 cells (a rat Müller glial cell line), with greatest expression in the Müller endnote next to the internal limiting membrane.

== See also ==
- Human iron metabolism
- Ceruloplasmin
