= Gabriela Schlau-Cohen =

Gabriela S. Schlau-Cohen
- Education: Brown University, University of California, Berkeley
- Scientific career
- Fields: Chemistry
- Workplaces: Massachusetts Institute of Technology
- Academic advisors: Graham Fleming, W.E. Moerner
- Website: www.schlaucohenlab.com

Gabriela S. Schlau-Cohen is a Thomas D. and Virginia W. Cabot Career Development Associate Professor at MIT in the Department of Chemistry.

== Education and career ==
Schlau-Cohen received a BS with honors in chemical physics from Brown University in 2003. She completed her PhD in chemistry in 2011 at the University of California, Berkeley, where she worked with Professor Graham R. Fleming as an American Association of University Women (AAUW) fellow. From 2011 to 2014, Schlau-Cohen was a Center for Molecular Analysis and Design (CMAD) postdoctoral fellow at Stanford University. She worked with Professor W.E. Moerner and Professor Ed Solomon on oxidative enzyme mechanisms, employing "time-dependent, single-molecule spectroscopy and steady-state ensemble measurements to study the kinetics of electron transfer in Fet3p, the MCO [multi-copper oxidase ] responsible for iron uptake in yeast."

In 2015, Schlau-Cohen joined the faculty of MIT as an assistant professor and was promoted to associate professor on July 1, 2020. Her research group at MIT, also known as the Schlau-Cohen Lab, is at the intersection of physical and biological chemistry. The lab focuses on using "a combination of single-molecule and ultrafast spectroscopies to explore the energetic and structural dynamics of biological systems." Schlau-Cohen's team works to "develop and apply tools to uncover the conformational and photophysical mechanisms of photosynthetic light harvesting and its regulation."

Schlau-Cohen has served as associate director of the Bioinspired Light Escalated Chemistry Energy Frontier Research Center (BioLEC EFRC), a member of the Executive Committee of the APS Division of Laser Science, and as a STEM ambassador for the American Association of University Women.

== Awards and honors ==
- 2024 – Benjamin Franklin NextGen Award
- 2020 – The Journal of Physical Chemistry and PHYS Division Lectureship Award
- 2020 – Camille Dreyfus Teacher-Scholar Award
- 2020 – James L. Kinsey Memorial Lecturer at Rice University
- 2018 – Scialog Fellow for Chemical Machinery of the Cell
- 2018 – CIFAR Bio-inspired Solar Energy Fellow
- 2018 – Sloan Research Fellow in Chemistry
- 2017 – NIH Director's New Innovator Award
- 2016 – CIFAR Azrieli Global Scholar
- 2016 – Beckman Young Investigator Award
- 2015 – Smith Family Award for Excellence in Biomedical Research
- 2013 – Postdoctoral Research Award, ACS PHYS Division
- 2010–2011 – American Fellowship, American Association of University Women
- 2007 – Abramson Graduate Scholarship, University of California, Berkeley
- 1999 – Esther Poncz Memorial Scholarship, Children's Hospital of Philadelphia

== Selected publications ==
1. Son, Minjung; Pinnola, Alberta; Gordon, Samuel C.; Bassi, Roberto; Schlau-Cohen, Gabriela S. (March 10, 2020). "Observation of dissipative chlorophyll-to-carotenoid energy transfer in light-harvesting complex II in membrane nanodiscs". Nature Communications. 11 (1). Springer Science and Business Media LLC: 1295. Bibcode:2020NatCo..11.1295S. doi:10.1038/s41467-020-15074-6. ISSN 2041-1723. PMC 7064482. PMID 32157079.
2. Kondo, Toru; Gordon, Jesse B.; Pinnola, Alberta; Dall'Osto, Luca; Bassi, Roberto; Schlau-Cohen, Gabriela S. (May 17, 2019). "Microsecond and millisecond dynamics in the photosynthetic protein LHCSR1 observed by single-molecule correlation spectroscopy". Proceedings of the National Academy of Sciences. 116 (23): 11247–11252. Bibcode:2019PNAS..11611247K. doi:10.1073/pnas.1821207116. ISSN 0027-8424. PMC 6561297. PMID 31101718.
3. Son, Minjung; Pinnola, Alberta; Bassi, Roberto; Schlau-Cohen, Gabriela S. (2019). "The Electronic Structure of Lutein 2 Is Optimized for Light Harvesting in Plants". Chem. 5 (3). Elsevier BV: 575–584. doi:10.1016/j.chempr.2018.12.016. ISSN 2451-9294. S2CID 128034970.
4. Quinn, Steven D.; Srinivasan, Shwetha; Gordon, Jesse B.; He, Wei; Carraway, Kermit L.; Coleman, Matthew A.; Schlau-Cohen, Gabriela S. (March 19, 2018). "Single-Molecule Fluorescence Detection of the Epidermal Growth Factor Receptor in Membrane Discs". Biochemistry. 58 (4). American Chemical Society (ACS): 286–294. doi:10.1021/acs.biochem.8b00089. ISSN 0006-2960. PMC 6173994. PMID 29553754.
5. Ogren, John I.; Tong, Ashley L.; Gordon, Samuel C.; Chenu, Aurélia; Lu, Yue; Blankenship, Robert E.; Cao, Jianshu; Schlau-Cohen, Gabriela S. (2018). "Impact of the lipid bilayer on energy transfer kinetics in the photosynthetic protein LH2". Chemical Science. 9 (12). Royal Society of Chemistry (RSC): 3095–3104. doi:10.1039/c7sc04814a. ISSN 2041-6520. PMC 5914429. PMID 29732092.
6. Kondo, Toru; Chen, Wei Jia; Schlau-Cohen, Gabriela S. (January 10, 2017). "Single-Molecule Fluorescence Spectroscopy of Photosynthetic Systems". Chemical Reviews. 117 (2). American Chemical Society (ACS): 860–898. doi:10.1021/acs.chemrev.6b00195. ISSN 0009-2665. OSTI 1388262. PMID 28072519.
7. Schlau-Cohen, Gabriela S.; Berry, Joseph (2015). "Photosynthetic fluorescence, from molecule to planet". Physics Today. 68 (9). AIP Publishing: 66–67. Bibcode:2015PhT....68i..66S. doi:10.1063/pt.3.2924. ISSN 0031-9228.
8. Schlau-Cohen, G. S. (June 6, 2015). "Principles of light harvesting from single photosynthetic complexes". Interface Focus. 5 (3) 20140088. The Royal Society. doi:10.1098/rsfs.2014.0088. ISSN 2042-8898. PMC 4410562. PMID 26052423.
9. Schlau-Cohen, Gabriela S.; Yang, Hsiang-Yu; Krüger, Tjaart P. J.; Xu, Pengqi; Gwizdala, Michal; van Grondelle, Rienk; Croce, Roberta; Moerner, W. E. (February 23, 2015). "Single-Molecule Identification of Quenched and Unquenched States of LHCII". The Journal of Physical Chemistry Letters. 6 (5). American Chemical Society (ACS): 860–867. doi:10.1021/acs.jpclett.5b00034. hdl:2263/58962. ISSN 1948-7185. PMID 26262664.
