= Iron response element =

- Predicted secondary structure and sequence conservation of IRE

Identifiers
- Symbol: IRE
- Rfam: RF00037

Other data
- RNA type: Cis-reg
- Domain: Eukaryota
- SO: SO:0000233
- PDB structures: PDBe

Crystal structure of iron regulatory protein 1 in complex with ferritin H IRE-RNA, Protein Data Bank entry 2IPY.

In molecular biology, the iron response element or iron-responsive element (IRE) is a short conserved stem-loop which is bound by iron response proteins (IRPs, also named IRE-BP or IRBP). The IRE is found in UTRs (untranslated regions) of various mRNAs whose products are involved in iron metabolism. For example, the mRNA of ferritin (an iron storage protein) contains one IRE in its 5' UTR. When iron concentration is low, IRPs bind the IRE in the ferritin mRNA and cause reduced translation rates. In contrast, binding to multiple IREs in the 3' UTR of the transferrin receptor (involved in iron acquisition) leads to increased mRNA stability.

== Mechanism of action ==
The two leading theories describe how iron probably interacts to impact posttranslational control of transcription. The classical theory suggests that IRPs, in the absence of iron, bind avidly to the mRNA IRE. When iron is present, it interacts with the protein to cause it to release the mRNA. For example, In high iron conditions in humans, IRP1 binds with an iron-sulphur complex [4Fe-4S] and adopts an aconitase conformation unsuitable for IRE binding. In contrast, IRP2 is degraded in high iron conditions. There is variation in affinity between different IREs and different IRPs.

In the second theory two proteins compete for the IRE binding site—both IRP and eukaryotic Initiation Factor 4F (eIF4F). In the absence of iron IRP binds about 10 times more avidly than the initiation factor. However, when Iron interacts at the IRE, it causes the mRNA to change its shape, thus favoring the binding of the eIF4F. Several studies have identified non-canonical IREs. It has also been shown that IRP binds to some IREs better than others.

Structural details. The upper helix of the known IREs shows stronger conservation of structure compared to the lower helix. The bases composing the helixes are variable. The mid-stem bulged C is a highly characteristic feature (though this has been seen to be a G in the ferritin IRE for lobster). The apical loop of the known IREs all consist of either the AGA or AGU triplet. This is pinched by a paired G-C and there is additionally a bulged U, C or A in the upper helix. The crystal structure and NMR data show a bulged U in the lower stem of the ferritin IRE. This is consistent with the predicted secondary structure. IREs in many other mRNAs do not have any support for this bulged U. Consequently, two RFAM models have been created for the IRE—one with a bulged U and one without.

== Genes with IREs ==
Genes known to contain IREs include FTH1, FTL, TFRC, ALAS2, Sdhb, ACO2, Hao1, SLC11A2 (encoding DMT1), NDUFS1, SLC40A1 (encoding the ferroportin) CDC42BPA , CDC14A, EPAS1.

In humans, 12 genes have been shown to be transcribed with the canonical IRE structure, but several mRNA structures, that are non-canonical, have been shown to interact with IRPs and be influenced by iron concentration. Software and algorithms have been developed to locate more genes that are also responsive to iron concentration.

Taxonomic range. The IRE is found over a diverse taxonomic range—mainly eukaryotes but not in plants.

== Processes regulated by IREs ==
Many genes regulated by IREs have clear and direct roles in iron metabolism. Others show a less obvious connection. ACO2 encodes an isomerase catalysing the reversible isomerisation of citrate and isocitrate. EPAS1 encodes a transcription factor involved in complex oxygen sensing pathways by the induction of oxygen regulated genes under low oxygen conditions. CDC42BPA encodes a kinase with a role in cytoskeletal reorganisation. CDC14A encodes a dual-specificity phosphatase implicated in cell cycle control and also interacts with interphase centrosomes.

== See also ==
- 5'UTR
- IRP
