= MiR397 microRNA precursor family =

Short RNA molecule

miR397

Identifiers
- Symbol: miR397
- Rfam: RF00704
- miRBase family: MIPF0000120

Other data
- RNA type: microRNA
- Domain: Viridiplantae
- PDB structures: PDBe

In molecular biology, miR397 is a conserved plant microRNA that regulates gene expression through sequence-directed cleavage or translational repression of target mRNAs. miR397 is widely conserved in flowering plants including Arabidopsis thaliana, Oryza sativa, and Populus trichocarpa.

Members of the miR397 family primarily target transcripts encoding laccase enzymes, which are multicopper oxidases involved in processes such as lignin polymerization and plant cell wall formation. Regulation of laccase expression by miR397 contributes to the control of lignin deposition and vascular development.

Expression of miR397 is influenced by copper availability. Under copper-limiting conditions, miR397 and related microRNAs are induced to down-regulate copper-containing proteins, allowing plants to conserve copper for essential processes such as photosynthetic electron transport.

In rice (Oryza sativa), the miR397–LACCASE regulatory module has also been implicated in grain yield regulation. miR397-mediated control of laccase genes influences brassinosteroid signaling pathways, with downstream effects on growth and yield traits.

== See also ==
- MicroRNA
