= MiR408 microRNA precursor family =

Name of an RNA molecule

miR408

Identifiers
- Symbol: miR408
- Rfam: RF00690
- miRBase family: MIPF0000102

Other data
- RNA type: microRNA
- Domain: Viridiplantae
- PDB structures: PDBe

In molecular biology, miR408 is a conserved plant microRNA that regulates gene expression through sequence-directed cleavage or translational repression of target mRNAs. miR408 occurs broadly across flowering plants including Arabidopsis thaliana, Oryza sativa, and woody species such as poplar.

miR408 primarily regulates genes encoding copper-binding proteins, including plantacyanin and members of the laccase family. Through these targets, miR408 contributes to the regulation of copper allocation and the broader "copper economy" network in plants that balances copper distribution among essential proteins.

Expression of miR408 is controlled by environmental signals including copper availability and light. In Arabidopsis, the transcription factors HY5 and SPL7 coordinate transcriptional regulation of MIR408, linking copper homeostasis with light signaling and photosynthetic metabolism.

Recent studies have revealed additional developmental and physiological roles for miR408. In Arabidopsis, the miR408–plantacyanin regulatory module influences reactive oxygen species homeostasis in guard cells, balancing plant growth with drought resistance. miR408 has also been implicated in vascular development, where it promotes cambium formation and tracheary element differentiation during xylem development.

In crop species, miR408 can influence growth and yield-related traits. For example, in rice the miR408 regulatory network participates in auxin signaling pathways controlling plant architecture. Manipulation of miR408 expression has also been shown to affect lignification, biomass accumulation, and cell wall accessibility in poplar, demonstrating potential applications in bioenergy crop improvement.

== See also ==
- MicroRNA
