= Michael Kanost =

American biology professor

- Born: 1956 (age 69–70); Cheyenne, Wyoming
- Education: Colorado State University; Purdue University
- Scientific career
- Workplaces: Queen's University; University of Arizona; Kansas State University

Michael R. Kanost (born 1956) is an American Professor in the Department of Biochemistry and Molecular Biophysics at Kansas State University.

== Early life and education ==
Kanost was born in 1956 in Cheyenne, Wyoming. His interest in general science started in grade school, in Cheyenne and continued in junior high and high school after his family moved to Broomfield, Colorado in 1968. In 1975 Kanost enrolled in Colorado State University from which he graduated in 1979 with a B.S. in zoology and entomology. In 1983 Kanost received his Ph.D. in entomology from Purdue University after being mentored by Peter Dunn there. While at Purdue, the duo studied pathogenic bacteria of Manduca sexta and how infections stimulate synthesis of hemolymph antibacterial proteins.

== Career ==
Following the dissertation, Kanost became a postdoc in the Department of Biology at Queen's University in Kingston, Ontario. There he worked with Prof. G.R. Wyatt and helped him study protein synthesis stimulated by juvenile hormone and insect hemolymph proteins. In 1986, Kanost moved to the University of Arizona's Department of Biochemistry, where he worked with Prof. Michael Wells.

From 1986 to 1991, Kanost was a Research Associate and later Research Assistant Professor at UA, studying lipophorin and serpins in insect hemolymph. In 1991, Kanost became assistant professor of Biochemistry at Kansas State University, and in 2005 he was promoted to University Distinguished Professor. He also served as head of the department from 2002 to 2012.

== Research ==
In 2005 Kanost was a member of a small research team that suggested that silencing the enzyme laccase-2 in a beetle prevents cuticle tanning, the process of hardening and pigmenting the insect's exoskeleton. The research suggests that understanding the exoskeleton's chemistry may also lead to development of new strategies for pest control or for development of lightweight and strong materials.

In 2016, he led an effort to sequence and annotate the Manduca sexta genome.

== Personal life ==
Since 1977, Michael Kanost is married to Jill, and is a father to four children. When he is not at his desk studying insects, Kanost is playing the cello with the Salina (Kansas) Symphony and growing tomatoes.

== Awards ==
- Fellow of the American Association for the Advancement of Science (2003)
- Fellow of the Entomological Society of America (2015)
