= STMP =

STMP may refer to:

- Sodium trimetaphosphate (also STMP), a metaphosphate of sodium
- Stamps.com (Nasdaq ticker: STMP), an American company that provides Internet-based mailing and shipping services
- STEAP2 (alias: STMP), an enzyme that in humans is encoded by the STEAP2 gene
- STMP, a chipset series manufactured by SigmaTel
