= IRBP =

IRBP may refer to two proteins:

- Iron-responsive element binding protein, involved in the regulation of iron metabolism; and
- RBP3 (Retinol-binding protein 3 = Interphotoreceptor retinoid-binding protein = Interstitial retinol-binding protein), an eye protein commonly used as a phylogenetic marker.
