= Oxygen reduction reaction =

Type of chemical reaction

In chemistry, the oxygen reduction reaction refers to the reduction half reaction whereby O_{2} is reduced to water or hydrogen peroxide. In fuel cells, the reduction to water is preferred because the current is higher. The oxygen reduction reaction is well demonstrated and highly efficient in nature.

== Stoichiometry ==
The stoichiometries of the oxygen reduction reaction, which depends on the medium, are shown:

4e^{−} pathway in acid medium: $\ce{O2 + 4 e- + 4H+ -> 2 H2O}$

2e^{−} pathway in acid medium: $\ce{O2 + 2e- + 2H+ -> H2O2}$

4e^{−} pathway in alkaline medium: $\ce{O2 + 4e- + 2H2O -> 4 OH-}$

2e^{−} pathway in alkaline medium: $\ce{O2 + 2e- + H2O -> HO2- + OH-}$

4e- pathway in solid oxide: $\ce{O2 + 4e- -> 2 O^2-}$

The 4e^{−} pathway reaction is the cathode reaction in fuel cell especially in proton-exchange membrane fuel cells, alkaline fuel cell and solid oxide fuel cell. While the 2e^{−} pathway reaction is often the side reaction of 4e- pathway or can be used in synthesis of H_{2}O_{2}.

== Catalysts ==
=== Biocatalysts ===
The oxygen reduction reaction is an essential reaction for aerobic organisms. Such organisms are powered by the heat of combustion of fuel (food) by O_{2}. Rather than combustion, organisms rely on elaborate sequences of electron-transfer reactions, often coupled to proton transfer. The direct reaction of O_{2} with fuel is precluded by the oxygen reduction reaction, which produces water and adenosine triphosphate. Cytochrome c oxidase affects the oxygen reduction reaction by binding O_{2} in a heme–Cu complex. In laccase, O_{2} is engaged and reduced by a four-copper aggregate. Three Cu centers bind O_{2}, and one Cu center functions as an electron donor.

=== Heterogeneous catalysts ===
In fuel cells, platinum is the most common catalyst. Because platinum is expensive, it is dispersed on a carbon support. Certain facets of platinum are more active than others.

=== Coordination complexes ===
Detailed mechanistic work results from studies on transition metal dioxygen complexes, which represent models for the initial encounter between O_{2} and the metal catalyst. Early catalysts for the oxygen reduction reaction were based on cobalt phthalocyanines. Many related coordination complexes have been tested. as the oxygen reduction reaction catalyst and different electrocatalysis performance was achieved by these small molecules. These exciting results trigger further research of the non-noble metal contained small molecules used for the oxygen reduction reaction electrocatalyst. Besides phthalocyanine, porphyrin is also a suitable ligand for metal center to provide N_{4} part in the M-N_{4} site. In biosystems, many oxygen related physical chemical reactions are carried by proteins containing the metal-prophyrin unit such as O_{2} delivery, O_{2} storage, O_{2} reduction and H_{2}O_{2} oxidation.

=== Recent development and modification ===
Since the oxygen reduction reaction in fuel cells need to be catalyzed heterogeneously, conductive substrates such as carbon materials is always needed in constructing electrocatalysts. To increase the conductivity and enhance the substrate-loading interaction, thermal treatment is usually performed before application. During the treatment, M-N4 active sites turn to aggregate spontaneously due to the high intrinsic energy, which will dramatically decrease the active site density. Therefore, increasing the active site density and creating atomic level dispersed catalyst is a key step to improve the catalyst activity. To solve this problem, we can use some porous substrates to confine the active sites or use some defect or ligands to prevent the migration of the active site. In the mean time, the porous structure or the defect will also be beneficial to the oxygen absorption process.

Besides active site density, the electron configuration of M center in M-N_{4} active site also plays an important role in the activity and stability of an oxygen reduction reaction catalyst. Because the electron configuration of M center can affects the redox potential, which determines the activation energy of the oxygen reduction reaction. To modulate the electron configuration, a simple way is to change the ligands of the metal center. For example, researchers found that whether the N atoms in M-N4 active sites are pyrrolic or pyridinic can affect the performance of the catalyst. Besides, some heteroatoms such as S, P other than N can also be used to modulate the electron configuration too, since these atoms have different electronegativity and electron configuration.
