= Natural resistance-associated macrophage protein 2 =

Protein-coding gene in humans

SLC11A2

Identifiers
- Aliases: SLC11A2, DCT1, DMT1, NRAMP2, AHMIO1, solute carrier family 11 member 2, divalent metal transporter 1, natural resistance-associated macrophage protein 2, divalent cation transporter 1
- External IDs: OMIM: 600523; MGI: 1345279; GeneCards: SLC11A2

Gene location (Human)
Chr.	Chromosome 12 (human)
Band	12q13.12	Start	50,979,401 bp
Band	12q13.12	End	51,028,566 bp

Gene location (Mouse)
Chr.	Chromosome 15 (mouse)
Band	15 F1|15 56.29 cM	Start	100,285,779 bp
Band	15 F1|15 56.29 cM	End	100,322,953 bp
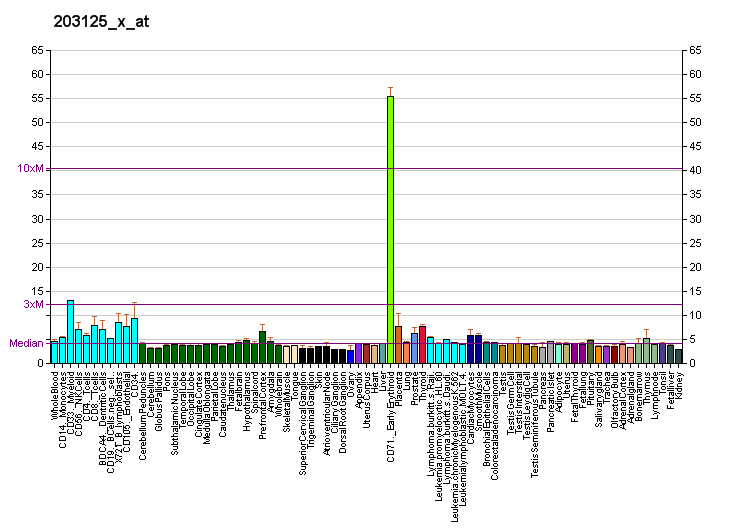

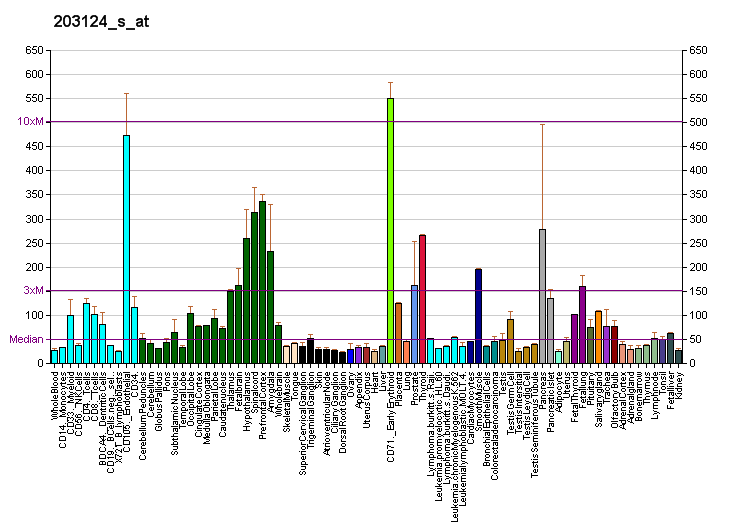

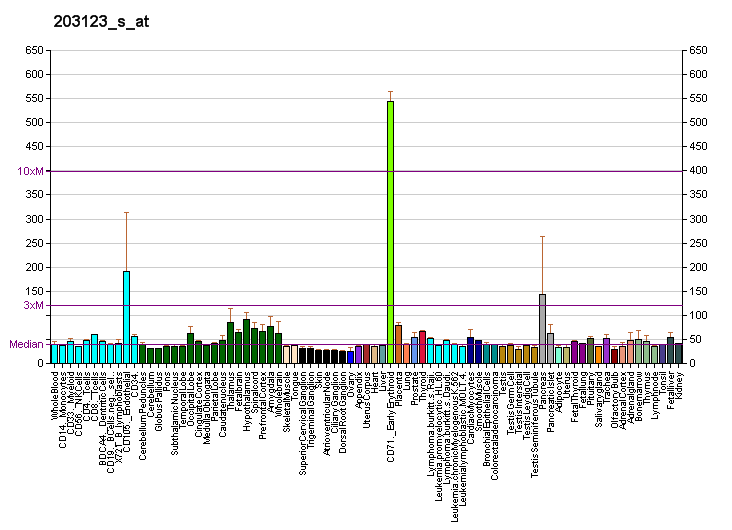
RNA expression pattern
Bgee	Human / Mouse (ortholog); Top expressed in: inferior ganglion of vagus nerve; buccal mucosa cell; caput epididymis; corpus callosum; cartilage tissue; oral cavity; minor salivary glands; superior vestibular nucleus; subthalamic nucleus; pons / Top expressed in: epithelium of small intestine; Ileal epithelium; spermatocyte; duodenum; lip; right kidney; primary oocyte; fetal liver hematopoietic progenitor cell; proximal tubule; yolk sac; More reference expression data
BioGPS	More reference expression data
Gene ontology
Molecular function	vanadium ion transmembrane transporter activity; transporter activity; transition metal ion transmembrane transporter activity; lead ion transmembrane transporter activity; proton transmembrane transporter activity; cadmium ion binding; manganese ion transmembrane transporter activity; cobalt ion transmembrane transporter activity; zinc ion transmembrane transporter activity; chromium ion transmembrane transporter activity; solute:proton symporter activity; protein binding; copper ion transmembrane transporter activity; nickel cation transmembrane transporter activity; calcium ion transmembrane transporter activity; inorganic cation transmembrane transporter activity; cadmium ion transmembrane transporter activity; iron ion transmembrane transporter activity; ferrous iron transmembrane transporter activity; iron ion binding; copper ion binding; zinc ion binding; nickel cation binding; manganese ion binding; metal ion transmembrane transporter activity; cobalt ion binding
Cellular component	cytoplasm; endosome; membrane; basal part of cell; retromer complex; trans-Golgi network; perinuclear region of cytoplasm; nucleus; late endosome membrane; cell surface; mitochondrial outer membrane; apical plasma membrane; lysosome; integral component of membrane; recycling endosome; late endosome; plasma membrane; apical part of cell; early endosome; brush border; endosome membrane; paraferritin complex; integral component of plasma membrane; brush border membrane; lysosomal membrane; vacuole; cytoplasmic vesicle; endomembrane system; mitochondrion; extracellular vesicle
Biological process	cadmium ion transmembrane transport; activation of cysteine-type endopeptidase activity involved in apoptotic process; proton transmembrane transport; lead ion transport; iron ion homeostasis; ion transport; heme biosynthetic process; multicellular organismal iron ion homeostasis; learning or memory; iron ion transmembrane transport; dendrite morphogenesis; porphyrin-containing compound biosynthetic process; response to iron ion; iron ion transport; copper ion transport; response to hypoxia; cobalt ion transport; detection of oxygen; cellular response to oxidative stress; manganese ion transport; nickel cation transport; erythrocyte development; porphyrin-containing compound metabolic process; cellular iron ion homeostasis; cation transmembrane transport; manganese ion transmembrane transport; vanadium ion transport; zinc ion transmembrane transport; nickel cation transmembrane transport; copper ion transmembrane transport; transport; metal ion transport; iron import into cell
Sources:Amigo / QuickGO
Orthologs
Databases	NCBI: entry; OMA: entry
Species	Human	Mouse
Entrez	4891	18174
Ensembl	ENSG00000110911	ENSMUSG00000023030
UniProt	P49281	P49282
RefSeq (mRNA)	NM_000617; NM_001174125; NM_001174126; NM_001174127; NM_001174128 NM_001174129; NM_001174130; NM_001379446; NM_001379447; NM_001379448; NM_001379455	NM_001146161; NM_008732; NM_001356952
RefSeq (protein)	NP_000608; NP_001167596; NP_001167597; NP_001167598; NP_001167599 NP_001167600; NP_001167601; NP_001366375; NP_001366376; NP_001366377; NP_001366384	NP_001139633; NP_032758; NP_001343881
Location (UCSC)	Chr 12: 50.98 – 51.03 Mb	Chr 15: 100.29 – 100.32 Mb
PubMed search
- Wikidata
View/Edit Human	View/Edit Mouse

Natural resistance-associated macrophage protein 2 (NRAMP 2), also known as divalent metal transporter 1 (DMT1) and divalent cation transporter 1 (DCT1), is a protein that in humans is encoded by the SLC11A2 (solute carrier family 11, member 2) gene. DMT1 represents a large family of orthologous metal ion transporter proteins that are highly conserved from bacteria to humans.

As its name suggests, DMT1 binds a variety of divalent metals including cadmium (Cd^{2+}), copper (Cu^{2+}), and zinc (Zn^{2+,}); however, it is best known for its role in transporting ferrous iron (Fe^{2+}). DMT1 expression is regulated by body iron stores to maintain iron homeostasis. DMT1 is also important in the absorption and transport of manganese (Mn^{2+}). In the digestive tract, it is located on the apical membrane of enterocytes, where it carries out H^{+}-coupled transport of divalent metal cations from the intestinal lumen into the cell.

== Function ==
Iron is not only essential for the human body, it is required for all organisms in order for them to be able to grow. Iron also participates in many metabolic pathways. Iron deficiency can lead to iron-deficiency anemia thus iron regulation is very crucial in the human body.

=== In mammals ===
The process of iron transportation consists of iron being reduced by ferrireductases that are present on the cell surface or by dietary reductants such as ascorbate (Vitamin C). Once the Fe^{3+} has been reduced to Fe^{2+}, the DMT1 transporter protein transports the Fe^{2+} ions into the cells that line the small intestine (enterocytes). From there, the ferroportin/IREG1 transporter exports it across the cell membrane where is it oxidized to Fe^{3+} on the surface of the cell then bound by transferrin and released into the blood stream.

=== Ion selectivity ===
DMT1 is not a 100% selective transporter as it also transports Zn^{2+}, Mn^{2+}, and Ca^{2+} which can lead to toxicity problems. The reason for this is because it cannot distinguish the difference between the different metal ions due to low selectivity for iron ions. In addition, it causes the metal ions to compete for transportation and the concentration of iron ions is typically substantially lower than that of other ions.

=== Yeast vs. mammal pathway ===
The iron uptake pathway in Saccharomyces cerevisiae, which consists of a multicopper ferroxidase (Fet3) and an iron plasma permease (FTR1) has a high affinity for iron uptake compared to the DMT1 iron uptake process present in mammals. The iron uptake process in yeasts consists of Fe^{3+} which is reduced to Fe^{2+} by ferriductases. Ferrous iron may also be present outside of the cell due to other reductants present in the extracellular medium. Ferrous iron is then oxidized to ferric iron by Fet3 on the external surface of the cell. Then Fe^{3+} is transferred from Fet3 to FTR1 and transferred across the cell membrane into the cell.

Ferrous-oxidase mediated transport systems exist in order to transport specific ions opposed to DMT1, which does not have complete specificity. The Fet3/FTR1 iron uptake pathway is able to achieve complete specificity for iron over other ions due to the multi-step nature of the pathway. Each of the steps involved in the pathway is specific to either ferrous iron or ferric iron. The DMT1 transporter protein does not have specificity over the ions it transports because it is unable to distinguish between Fe^{2+} and the other divalent metal ions it transfer through the cell membrane. Although, the reason that non-specific ion transporters, such as DMT1, exist is due to their ability to function in anaerobic environments opposed to the Fet3/FTR1 pathway which requires oxygen as a co substrate. So in anaerobic environments the oxidase would not be able to function thus another means of iron uptake is necessary.

== Role in neurodegenerative diseases ==
Toxic accumulation of divalent metals, especially iron and/or manganese, are frequently discussed aetiological factors in a variety of neurodegenerative diseases, including Alzheimer's disease, Parkinson's disease, amyotrophic lateral sclerosis, and multiple sclerosis. DMT1 may be the major transporter of manganese across the blood brain barrier and expression of this protein in the nasal epithelium provides a route for direct absorption of metals into the brain. DMT1 expression in the brain may increase with age, increasing susceptibility to metal induced pathologies. DMT1 expression is found to be increased in the substantia nigra of Parkinson's patients and in the ventral mesencephalon of animal models intoxicated with 1-methyl-4-phenyl-1,2,3,6-tetrahydropyridine (MPTP) - a neurotoxin widely used experimentally to produce Parkinsonian symptoms.

The DMT1 encoding gene SLC11A2 is located on the long arm of chromosome 12 (12q13) close to susceptibility regions for Alzheimer's disease and restless legs syndrome. The C allele of SNP rs407135 on the DMT1 encoding gene SLC11A2 is associated with shorter disease duration in cases of spinal onset amyotrophic lateral sclerosis, and is implicated in Alzheimer's disease onset in males as well. The CC haplotype for SNPs 1254T/C IVS34+44C/A is associated with Parkinson's disease susceptibility. Finally, variant alleles on several SLC11A2 SNPs are associated with iron anemia, a risk factor for manganese intoxication and restless legs syndrome.
