= Multicopper oxidase =

Class of enzymes

Multicopper oxidase (type 1)
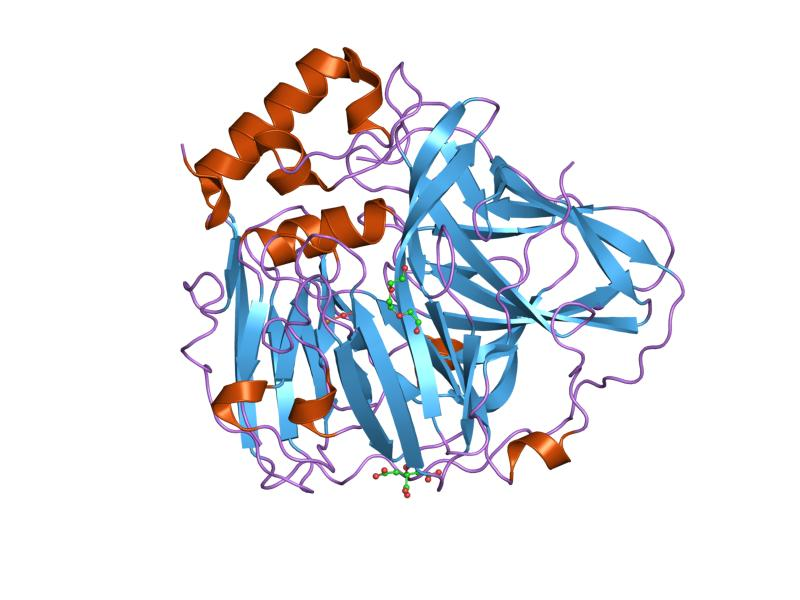
- crystal structures of e. coli laccase cueo under different copper binding situations

Identifiers
- Symbol: Cu-oxidase
- Pfam: PF00394
- Pfam clan: CL0026
- InterPro: IPR001117
- PROSITE: PDOC00076
- SCOP2: 1aoz / SCOPe / SUPFAM
- Membranome: 253
Available protein structures:
- PDB: IPR001117 PF00394 (ECOD; PDBsum)
- AlphaFold: IPR001117; PF00394

Multicopper oxidase (type 2)
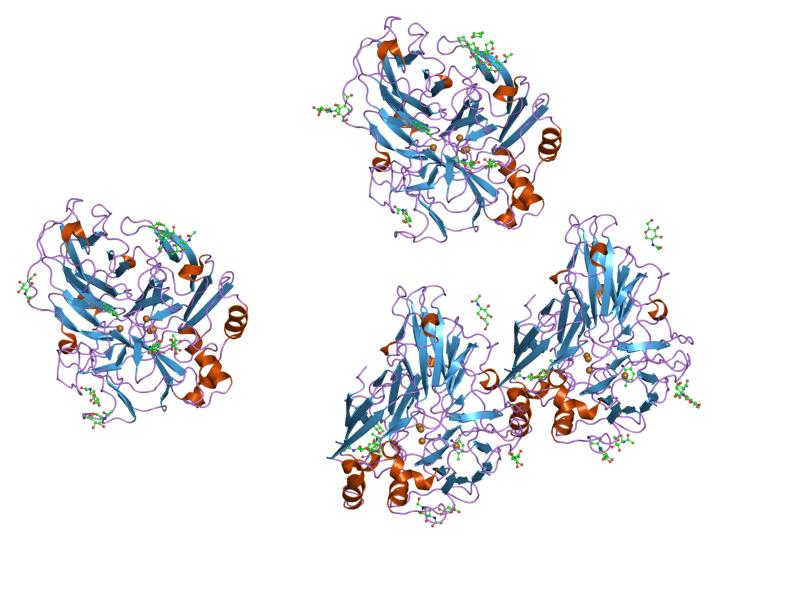
- active laccase from trametes versicolor complexed with 2,5-xylidine

Identifiers
- Symbol: Cu-oxidase_2
- Pfam: PF07731
- Pfam clan: CL0026
- InterPro: IPR011706
- SCOP2: 1aoz / SCOPe / SUPFAM
Available protein structures:
- PDB: IPR011706 PF07731 (ECOD; PDBsum)
- AlphaFold: IPR011706; PF07731

Multicopper oxidase (type 3)
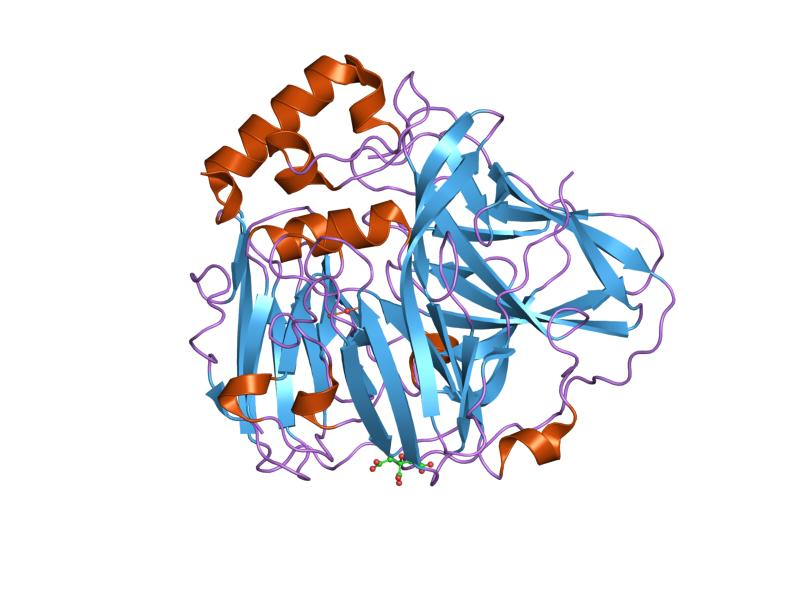
- crystal structures of e. coli laccase cueo under different copper binding situations

Identifiers
- Symbol: Cu-oxidase_3
- Pfam: PF07732
- Pfam clan: CL0026
- InterPro: IPR011707
- SCOP2: 1aoz / SCOPe / SUPFAM
Available protein structures:
- PDB: IPR011707 PF07732 (ECOD; PDBsum)
- AlphaFold: IPR011707; PF07732

CMulti-copper polyphenol oxidoreductase laccase
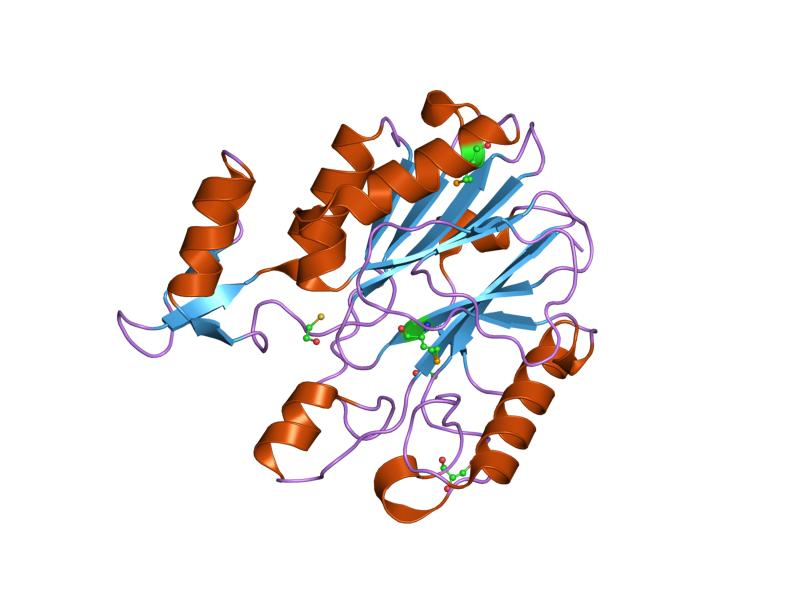
- crystal structure of protein cc_0490 from caulobacter crescentus, pfam duf152

Identifiers
- Symbol: Cu-oxidase_4
- Pfam: PF02578
- InterPro: IPR003730
Available protein structures:
- PDB: IPR003730 PF02578 (ECOD; PDBsum)
- AlphaFold: IPR003730; PF02578

In molecular biology, multicopper oxidases are enzymes which oxidise their substrate by accepting electrons at a mononuclear copper centre and transferring them to a trinuclear copper centre; dioxygen binds to the trinuclear centre and, following the transfer of four electrons, is reduced to two molecules of water. There are three spectroscopically different copper centres found in multicopper oxidases: type 1 (or blue), type 2 (or normal) and type 3 (or coupled binuclear). Multicopper oxidases consist of 2, 3 or 6 of these homologous domains, which also share homology with the cupredoxins azurin and plastocyanin. Structurally, these domains consist of a cupredoxin-like fold, a beta-sandwich consisting of 7 strands in 2 beta-sheets, arranged in a Greek-key beta-barrel.

The family of multicopper oxidases can be divided into three groups based on the electron-donating substrate. Laccases oxidize a variety of organic substrates, metalloxidases accept metal substrates and a third group contains multicopper oxidases that are specific towards one single substrate. Multicopper oxidases include:

- Ceruloplasmin EC 1.16.3.1 (ferroxidase), a 6-domain enzyme found in the serum of mammals and birds that oxidizes different inorganic and organic substances; exhibits internal sequence homology that appears to have evolved from the triplication of a Cu-binding domain similar to that of laccase and ascorbate oxidase.
- Laccase EC 1.10.3.2 (urishiol oxidase), a 3-domain enzyme found in fungi and plants, which oxidizes different phenols and diamines. CueO is a laccase found in Escherichia coli that is involved in copper-resistance.
- Ascorbate oxidase EC 1.10.3.3, a 3-domain enzyme found in higher plants.
- Nitrite reductase EC 1.7.2.1, a 2-domain enzyme containing type-1 and type-2 copper centres.

In addition to the above enzymes there are a number of other proteins that are similar to the multi-copper oxidases in terms of structure and sequence, some of which have lost the ability to bind copper. These include: copper resistance protein A (copA) from a plasmid in Pseudomonas syringae; domain A of (non-copper binding) blood coagulation factors V (Fa V) and VIII (Fa VIII); yeast Fet3p (FET3) required for ferrous iron uptake; yeast hypothetical protein YFL041w; and the fission yeast homologue SpAC1F7.08.
