= CDC14A =

Protein-coding gene in humans

Identifiers
- Aliases: CDC14A, cdc14, hCDC14, cell division cycle 14A, DFNB105, DFNB35, DFNB32
- External IDs: OMIM: 603504; MGI: 2442676; GeneCards: CDC14A
Enzyme activity
EC #	BRENDA	ExPASy	KEGG	MetaCyc
3.1.3.16	↗	↗	↗	↗
3.1.3.48	↗	↗	↗	↗

Gene location (Human)
Chr.	Chromosome 1 (human)
Band	1p21.2	Start	100,345,001 bp
Band	1p21.2	End	100,520,277 bp

Gene location (Mouse)
Chr.	Chromosome 3 (mouse)
Band	3|3 G1	Start	116,272,553 bp
Band	3|3 G1	End	116,428,745 bp
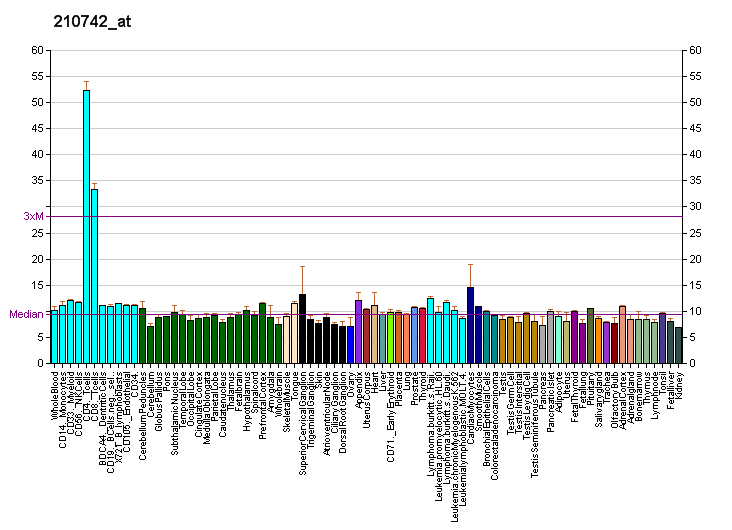

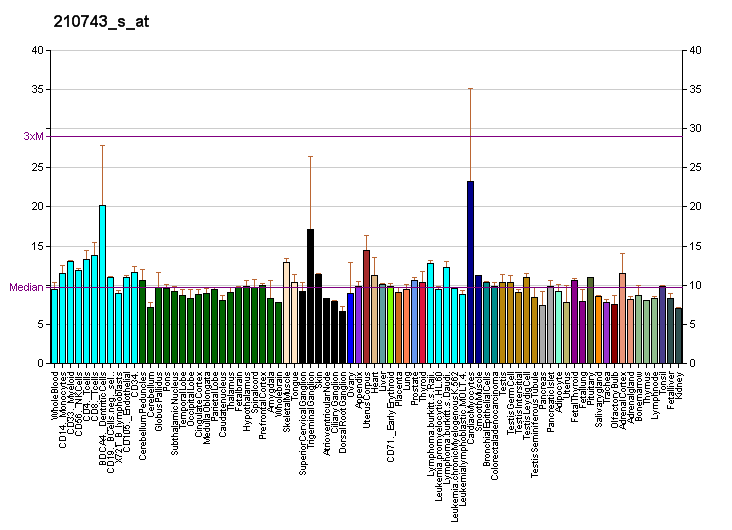
RNA expression pattern
Bgee	Human / Mouse (ortholog); Top expressed in: sperm; buccal mucosa cell; mucosa of paranasal sinus; right uterine tube; right testis; left testis; glomerulus; metanephric glomerulus; olfactory zone of nasal mucosa; Achilles tendon / Top expressed in: ciliary body; iris; retinal pigment epithelium; otolith organ; utricle; spermatid; vestibular sensory epithelium; olfactory epithelium; intercostal muscle; cumulus cell; More reference expression data
BioGPS	More reference expression data
Gene ontology
Molecular function	phosphoprotein phosphatase activity; phosphatase activity; protein serine/threonine phosphatase activity; protein binding; protein tyrosine phosphatase activity; hydrolase activity; protein tyrosine/serine/threonine phosphatase activity
Cellular component	centrosome; spindle; nucleoplasm; microtubule organizing center; mitotic spindle; cytoskeleton; nucleus; spindle pole; cytoplasm; cytosol; nuclear body; cell projection; kinocilium; stereocilium tip; kinociliary basal body; nucleolus; stereocilium
Biological process	mitotic spindle midzone assembly; protein dephosphorylation; cell division; cell cycle; cell population proliferation; dephosphorylation; peptidyl-tyrosine dephosphorylation; regulation of exit from mitosis; cilium assembly; hearing; microtubule cytoskeleton organization; mitotic cell cycle; positive regulation of cytokinesis
Sources:Amigo / QuickGO
Orthologs
Databases	NCBI: entry; OMA: entry
Species	Human	Mouse
Entrez	8556	229776
Ensembl	ENSG00000079335	ENSMUSG00000033502
UniProt	Q9UNH5	Q6GQT0
RefSeq (mRNA)	NM_003672; NM_033312; NM_033313; NM_001319210; NM_001319211 NM_001319212	NM_001080818; NM_001173553; NM_001355646; NM_001378993; NM_001378994
RefSeq (protein)	NP_001306139; NP_001306140; NP_001306141; NP_003663; NP_201569 NP_201570	NP_001074287; NP_001167024; NP_001342575; NP_001365922; NP_001365923
Location (UCSC)	Chr 1: 100.35 – 100.52 Mb	Chr 3: 116.27 – 116.43 Mb
PubMed search
- Wikidata
View/Edit Human	View/Edit Mouse

Dual specificity protein phosphatase CDC14A is an enzyme that in humans is encoded by the CDC14A gene.

The protein encoded by this gene is a member of the dual specificity protein tyrosine phosphatase family. This protein is highly similar to Saccharomyces cerevisiae Cdc14, a protein tyrosine phosphatase involved in the exit of cell mitosis and initiation of DNA replication, which suggests the role in cell cycle control. This protein has been shown to interact with and dephosphorylates tumor suppressor protein p53, and is thought to regulate the function of p53. Alternative splice of this gene results in 3 transcript variants encoding distinct isoforms.

== Interactions ==
CDC14A has been shown to interact with P53, de-phosphorylate p53 at Serine 315 and modulate p53 protein stability.
