= Duodenal cytochrome B =

Protein found in humans

Identifiers
- Aliases: CYBRD1, CYB561A2, DCYTB, FRRS3, cytochrome b reductase 1, duodenal cytochrome B
- External IDs: OMIM: 605745; MGI: 2654575; GeneCards: CYBRD1
Enzyme activity
| EC # | BRENDA | ExPASy | KEGG | MetaCyc |
|---|---|---|---|---|
| 7.2.1.3 | ↗ | ↗ | ↗ | ↗ |

Gene location (Human)
| Chr. | Chromosome 2 (human) |
| Band | 2q31.1 | Start | 171,522,247 bp |
| Band | 2q31.1 | End | 171,558,129 bp |

Gene location (Mouse)
| Chr. | Chromosome 2 (mouse) |
| Band | 2|2 C2 | Start | 70,948,267 bp |
| Band | 2|2 C2 | End | 70,973,270 bp |
RNA expression pattern
| Bgee | Human / Mouse (ortholog); Top expressed in: Achilles tendon; germinal epithelium; skin of hip; parietal pleura; jejunal mucosa; synovial joint; skin of thigh; superficial temporal artery; right coronary artery; gastric mucosa / Top expressed in: hair follicle; pyloric antrum; duodenum; epithelium of lens; epithelium of stomach; epithelium of small intestine; efferent ductule; vestibular sensory epithelium; molar; left lung lobe; More reference expression data |
| BioGPS | n/a |
Gene ontology
| Molecular function | oxidoreductase activity, acting on metal ions; oxidoreductase activity; ferric-chelate reductase activity; protein binding; metal ion binding |
| Cellular component | integral component of membrane; brush border membrane; plasma membrane; extracellular exosome; membrane; lysosomal membrane |
| Biological process | cellular iron ion homeostasis; response to iron ion |
Sources:Amigo / QuickGO
Orthologs
| Databases | NCBI: entry; OMA: entry |
| Species | Human | Mouse |
| Entrez | 79901 | 73649 |
| Ensembl | ENSG00000071967 | ENSMUSG00000027015 |
| UniProt | Q53TN4 | Q925G2 |
| RefSeq (mRNA) | NM_024843; NM_001127383; NM_001256909 | NM_028593 |
| RefSeq (protein) | NP_001120855; NP_001243838; NP_079119 | NP_082869 |
| Location (UCSC) | Chr 2: 171.52 – 171.56 Mb | Chr 2: 70.95 – 70.97 Mb |
| PubMed search |
- Wikidata
| View/Edit Human | View/Edit Mouse |

Duodenal cytochrome B (Dcytb) also known as cytochrome b reductase 1 is an enzyme that in humans is encoded by the CYBRD1 gene.

Dcytb CYBRD1 was first identified as a ferric reductase enzyme which catalyzes the reduction of Fe^{3+} to Fe^{2+} required for dietary iron absorption in the duodenum of mammals. Dcytb mRNA and protein levels in the gut are increased by iron deficiency and hypoxia which acts to promote dietary iron absorption. The effect of iron deficiency and hypoxia on Dcytb levels are medicated via the HIF2 (Hypoxia inducible factor 2) transcription factor which binds to hypoxia response elements within the Dcytb promoter and increases transcription of the gene. DCYTB protein has also been found in other tissues, such as lung epithelial cells and in the plasma membrane of mature red blood cells of scorbutic species (unable to make ascorbate) such as human and guinea pig but not in other species which have retained the ability to synthesise ascorbate like mice and rat. This has led to the notion that Dcytb may have an additional role in ascorbate metabolism in scorbutic species. DCYTB protein has also been found in breast tissue (epithelial and myoepithelial cells) and high DCYTB levels are associated with a favourable prognosis in patients with breast cancer. A single nucleotide polymorphism (SNP) within the DCYTB promoter (SNP rs884409) which reduced functional DCYTB promoter activity was also associated with reduced serum ferritin levels in a patient cohort with C282Y haemochromatosis.
