= L-ascorbate oxidase =

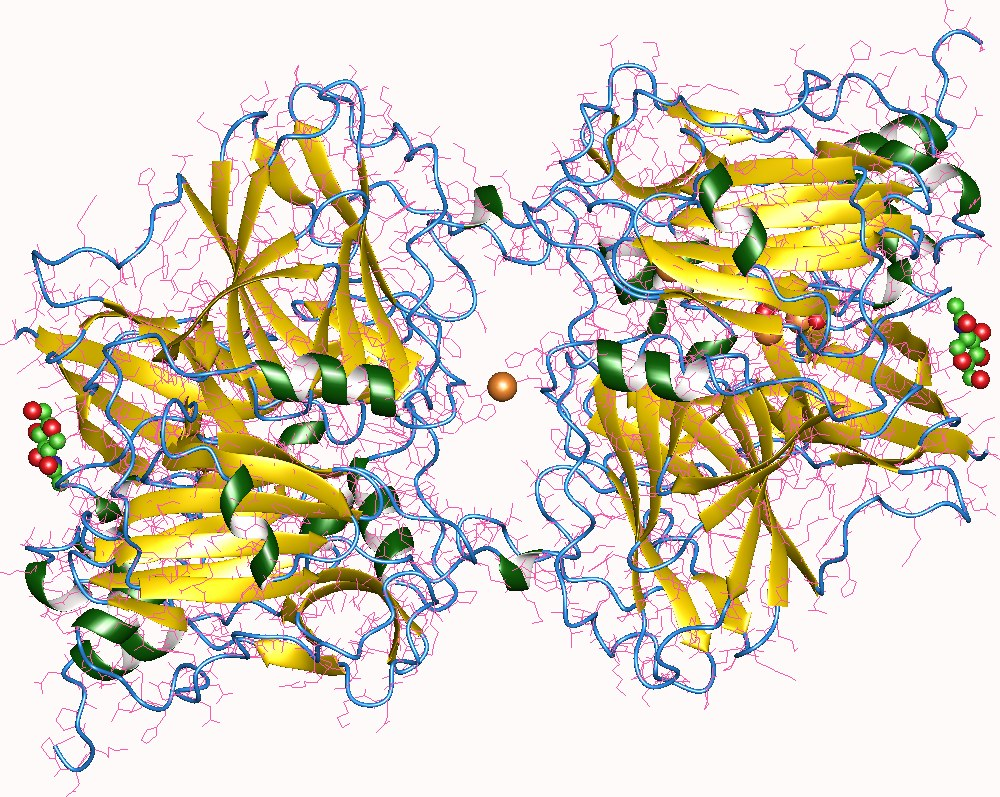

Identifiers
- EC no.: 1.10.3.3
- CAS no.: 9029-44-1

Databases
- BRENDA: enzyme data
- ExPASy: NiceZyme view
- KEGG: enzyme entry
- MetaCyc: metabolic pathway
- Rhea: reactions
- PDB structures: RCSB PDB PDBe PDBsum
- Gene Ontology: AmiGO / QuickGO
Search
- PMC: articles
- PubMed: articles
- NCBI: proteins

L-ascorbate oxidase (EC 1.10.3.3) is an enzyme that catalyzes the chemical reaction

2
ascorbic acid
O_{2}
2 H_{2}O
O_{2}
2 H_{2}O
2
dehydroascorbic acid

The two substrates of this enzyme are L-ascorbic acid (vitamin C) and oxygen. Its products are dehydroascorbic acid and water.

== Function ==
This enzyme belongs to the family of oxidoreductases, specifically those acting on diphenols and related substances as donor with oxygen as acceptor. It participates in ascorbate metabolism. It employs one cofactor, copper. An X-ray structure has been published.

== Nomenclature ==
The systematic name of this enzyme class is L-ascorbate:oxygen oxidoreductase. Other names in common use include ascorbase, ascorbic acid oxidase, ascorbate oxidase, ascorbic oxidase, ascorbate dehydrogenase, L-ascorbic acid oxidase, AAO, L-ascorbate:O2 oxidoreductase, and AA oxidase.
