= STEAP2 =

Protein-coding gene in the species Homo sapiens

Identifiers
- Aliases: STEAP2, IPCA1, PCANAP1, PUMPCn, STAMP1, STMP, STEAP2 metalloreductase
- External IDs: OMIM: 605094; MGI: 1921301; HomoloGene: 17682; GeneCards: STEAP2; OMA:STEAP2 - orthologs

Gene location (Human)
Chr.	Chromosome 7 (human)
Band	7q21.13	Start	90,167,590 bp
Band	7q21.13	End	90,238,137 bp

Gene location (Mouse)
Chr.	Chromosome 5 (mouse)
Band	5|5 A1	Start	5,714,829 bp
Band	5|5 A1	End	5,744,578 bp
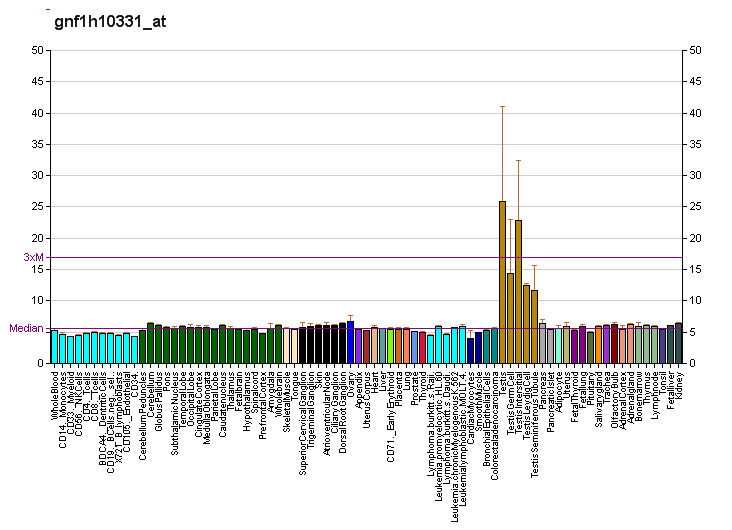

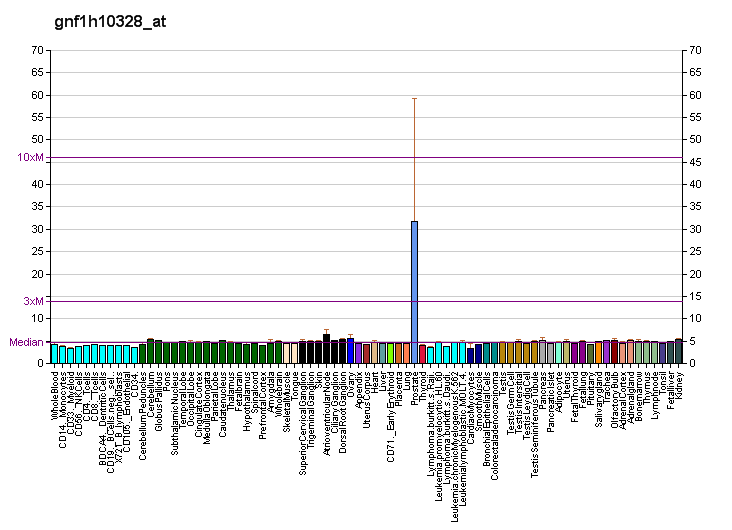
RNA expression pattern
Bgee	Human / Mouse (ortholog); Top expressed in: pericardium; Achilles tendon; prostate; cardiac muscle tissue of right atrium; Brodmann area 23; middle temporal gyrus; pancreatic epithelial cell; cerebellar vermis; superior frontal gyrus; cartilage tissue / Top expressed in: Epithelium of choroid plexus; endothelial cell of lymphatic vessel; oocyte; primary oocyte; secondary oocyte; lumbar subsegment of spinal cord; deep cerebellar nuclei; lobe of cerebellum; human kidney; olfactory epithelium; More reference expression data
BioGPS	More reference expression data
Gene ontology
Molecular function	transporter activity; metal ion binding; cupric reductase activity; ferric-chelate reductase (NADPH) activity; oxidoreductase activity
Cellular component	integral component of membrane; integral component of Golgi membrane; cytosol; endosome; membrane; plasma membrane; early endosome; trans-Golgi network transport vesicle; endosome membrane; integral component of plasma membrane
Biological process	endocytosis; iron ion homeostasis; copper ion import; ion transport; response to hormone; regulated exocytosis; Golgi to plasma membrane transport; iron ion import across cell outer membrane
Sources:Amigo / QuickGO
Orthologs
Species	Human	Mouse
Entrez	261729	74051
Ensembl	ENSG00000157214	ENSMUSG00000015653
UniProt	Q8NFT2	Q8BWB6
RefSeq (mRNA)	NM_001040665; NM_001040666; NM_001244944; NM_001244945; NM_001244946 NM_152999	NM_001103156; NM_001103157; NM_001285469; NM_001285470; NM_001285471 NM_028734
RefSeq (protein)	NP_001035755; NP_001035756; NP_001231873; NP_001231874; NP_001231875 NP_694544	NP_001096626; NP_001096627; NP_001272398; NP_001272399; NP_001272400 NP_083010
Location (UCSC)	Chr 7: 90.17 – 90.24 Mb	Chr 5: 5.71 – 5.74 Mb
PubMed search
- Wikidata
View/Edit Human	View/Edit Mouse

Metalloreductase STEAP2 is an enzyme that in humans is encoded by the STEAP2 gene.

This gene is a member of the STEAP family and encodes a multi-pass membrane protein that localizes to the Golgi complex, the plasma membrane, and the vesicular tubular structures in the cytosol.

A highly similar protein in mouse has both ferri reductase and cupric reductase activity, and stimulates the cellular uptake of both iron and copper in vitro. Increased transcriptional expression of the human gene is associated with prostate cancer progression. Alternate transcriptional splice variants, encoding different isoforms, have been characterized.
