= Iron-responsive element-binding protein =

Protein family

Iron Regulatory Protein
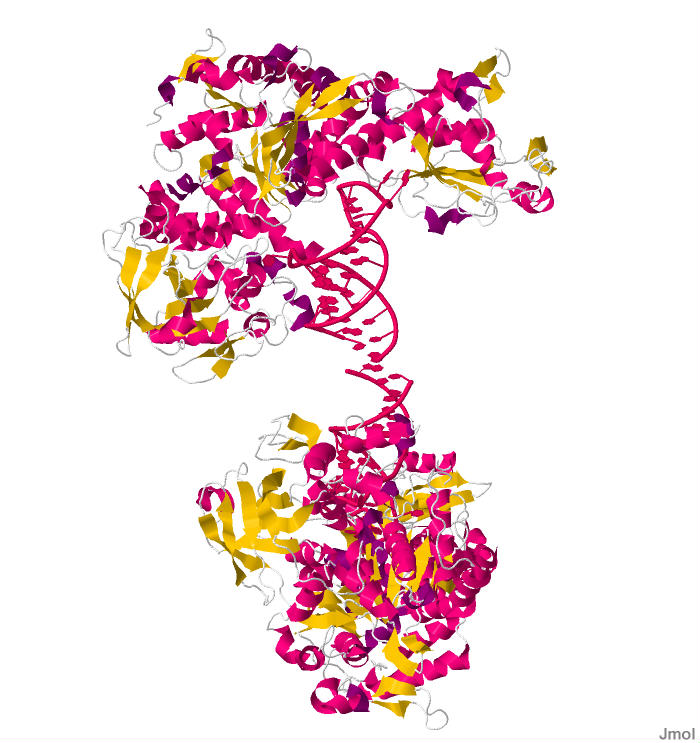

Identifiers
- Symbol: ACO1
- Alt. symbols: IREB1
- NCBI gene: 48
- HGNC: 117
- OMIM: 100880
- RefSeq: NM_002197
- UniProt: P21399

Other data
- EC number: 4.2.1.3
- Locus: Chr. 9 p21.1
Search for
- Structures: Swiss-model
- Domains: InterPro

iron-responsive element-binding protein 2

Identifiers
- Symbol: IREB2
- NCBI gene: 3658
- HGNC: 6115
- OMIM: 147582
- RefSeq: NM_004136
- UniProt: P48200

Other data
- Locus: Chr. 15 q25.1
Search for
- Structures: Swiss-model
- Domains: InterPro

The iron-responsive element-binding proteins, also known as IRE-BP, IRBP, IRP and IFR , bind to iron-responsive elements (IREs) in the regulation of human iron metabolism.

== Function ==
ACO1, or IRP1, is a bifunctional protein that functions as an iron-responsive element (IRE)-binding protein involved in the control of iron metabolism by binding mRNA to repress translation or degradation. It functions also as the cytoplasmic isoform of aconitase. Aconitases are iron-sulfur proteins that require a 4Fe-4S cluster for their enzymatic activity, in which they catalyze conversion of citrate to isocitrate. This structure was based on x-ray crystal diffraction. The resolution was 2.80 Å. This protein was harvested from the species Oryctolagus cuniculus, more commonly known as a rabbit. This protein has a couple of conformational changes associated with it to explain the alternative functions as either mRNA regulator or as an enzyme. This information was obtained from the RCSB protein data bank website.

IRP2 is less abundant than IRP1 in most cells. The strongest expression is in intestine and brain. Relative to IRP1, IRP2 has a 73-amino acid insertion, and this insertion mediates the IRP2 degradation in iron-replete cells. IRP2 is regulated by the F-Box FBXL5 which activate the ubiquitination and then the degradation of IRP2. IRP2 has no aconitase activity.

== Iron transport ==
All cells use some iron, and must get it from the circulating blood. Since iron is tightly bound to transferrin, cells throughout the body have receptors for transferrin-iron complexes on their surfaces. These receptors engulf and internalize both the protein and the iron attached to it. Once inside, the cell transfers the iron to ferritin, the internal iron storage molecule.

Cells have advanced mechanisms for sensing their own need for iron. In human cells, the best-characterized iron-sensing mechanism is the result of post-transcriptional regulation of mRNA (the chemical instructions derived from DNA genes to make proteins). Sequences of mRNA called iron-responsive elements (IREs) are contained within the mRNA sequences that code for transferrin receptors and for ferritin. Iron-responsive element-binding protein (IRE-BP) binds to these mRNA sequences. On its own, the IRE-BP binds to the IREs of ferritin and transferrin receptor mRNA. But, when iron binds to the IRE-BP, the IRE-BP changes shape with the result that the IRE-BPs can no longer bind the ferritin mRNA. This liberates the mRNA to direct the cell to make more ferritin. In other words, when there is high iron in the cell, the iron itself causes the cell to produce more iron storage molecules. (The IRE-BP is an aconitase; for a schematic drawing of the shape change, see here).

Transferrin receptor production depends on a similar mechanism. But this one has the opposite trigger, and the opposite ultimate effect. IRE-BPs without iron bind to the IREs on transferrin receptor mRNA. But those IREs have a different effect: When the IRE-BP binds to these sites, the binding not only allows for translation but also stabilizes the mRNA molecule so it can stay intact for longer.

In low-iron conditions, IRE-BPs allow the cell to keep producing transferrin receptors. And more transferrin receptors make it easier for the cell to bring in more iron from transferrin-iron complexes circulating outside the cell. But, as iron binds to more and more IRE-BPs, they change shape and unbind the transferrin receptor mRNA. The transferrin receptor mRNA is rapidly degraded without the IRE-BP attached to it. The cell stops producing transferrin receptors.

When the cell has obtained more iron than it can bind up with ferritin or heme molecules, more and more iron will bind to the IRE-BPs. That will stop transferrin receptor production. And iron-IRE-BP binding will also start ferritin production.

When the cell is low on iron, less and less iron will bind to IRE-BPs. The IRE-BPs without iron will bind to transferrin receptor mRNA.

== See also ==
- Iron-responsive element (IRE)
- Aconitase
- ACO1
