= Ferroportin =

Protein

SLC40A1

Identifiers
- Aliases: SLC40A1, IREG1, MST079, MSTP079, solute carrier family 40 member 1, MTP1, SLC11A3, FPN1, HFE4
- External IDs: OMIM: 604653; MGI: 1315204; GeneCards: SLC40A1

Gene location (Human)
Chr.	Chromosome 2 (human)
Band	2q32.2	Start	189,560,590 bp
Band	2q32.2	End	189,583,758 bp

Gene location (Mouse)
Chr.	Chromosome 1 (mouse)
Band	1|1 C1.1	Start	45,947,228 bp
Band	1|1 C1.1	End	45,965,683 bp
RNA expression pattern
Bgee	Human / Mouse (ortholog); Top expressed in: pancreatic ductal cell; jejunal mucosa; mucosa of ileum; germinal epithelium; trabecular bone; decidua; cardiac muscle tissue of right atrium; palpebral conjunctiva; superficial temporal artery; duodenum / Top expressed in: epithelium of small intestine; medullary collecting duct; stroma of bone marrow; duodenum; spleen; tibiofemoral joint; left colon; granulocyte; liver; ileum; More reference expression data
BioGPS	n/a
Gene ontology
Molecular function	ferrous iron transmembrane transporter activity; iron ion transmembrane transporter activity; peptide hormone binding; protein binding; identical protein binding
Cellular component	cytoplasm; integral component of membrane; membrane; synaptic vesicle; plasma membrane; integral component of plasma membrane; intracellular anatomical structure; basolateral plasma membrane; nucleoplasm; cytosol
Biological process	iron ion transmembrane transport; lymphocyte homeostasis; spleen trabecula formation; iron ion homeostasis; negative regulation of apoptotic process; ion transport; spleen development; multicellular organismal iron ion homeostasis; iron ion transport; endothelium development; iron ion export across plasma membrane; positive regulation of transcription by RNA polymerase II; cellular iron ion homeostasis; regulation of transcription from RNA polymerase II promoter in response to iron
Sources:Amigo / QuickGO
Orthologs
Databases	NCBI: entry; OMA: entry
Species	Human	Mouse
Entrez	30061	53945
Ensembl	ENSG00000138449	ENSMUSG00000025993
UniProt	Q9NP59	Q9JHI9
RefSeq (mRNA)	NM_014585	NM_016917
RefSeq (protein)	NP_055400	NP_058613
Location (UCSC)	Chr 2: 189.56 – 189.58 Mb	Chr 1: 45.95 – 45.97 Mb
PubMed search
- Wikidata
View/Edit Human	View/Edit Mouse

Ferroportin-1, also known as solute carrier family 40 member 1 (SLC40A1) or iron-regulated transporter 1 (IREG1), is a protein that in humans is encoded by the SLC40A1 gene. Ferroportin is a transmembrane protein that transports iron from the inside of a cell to the outside of the cell. Ferroportin is the only known iron exporter.

After dietary iron is absorbed into the cells of the small intestine, ferroportin allows that iron to be transported out of those cells and into the bloodstream. Fpn also mediates the efflux of iron recycled from macrophages resident in the spleen and liver.

Ferroportin is regulated by hepcidin, a hormone produced by the liver; hepcidin binds to Fpn and limits its iron-efflux activity, thereby reducing iron delivery to the blood plasma. Therefore, the interaction between Fpn and hepcidin controls systemic iron homeostasis.

== Structure ==
Members of the ferroportin family consist of 400-800 amino acid residues, with a highly conserved histidine at residue position 32 (H32), and exhibit 8-12 putative transmembrane domains. Human Fpn consists of 571 amino acid residues. When H32 is mutated in mice, iron transport activity is impaired.

Recent crystal structures generated from a bacterial homologue of ferroportin (from Bdellovibrio bacteriovorus) revealed that the Fpn structure resembles that of major facilitator superfamily (MFS) transporters. The prospective substrate binding site is located at the interface between the N-terminal and C-terminal halves of the protein, and is alternately accessible from either side of the cell membrane, consistent with MFS transporters.

== Function ==
Ferroportin-mediated iron efflux is calcium-activated; studies of human Fpn expressed in Xenopus laevis oocytes demonstrated that calcium is a required cofactor for Fpn, but that Fpn does not transport calcium. Thus, Fpn does not function as an iron/calcium antiporter. The thermodynamic driving force for Fpn remains unknown.

In addition to iron, human ferroportin has been shown to transport cobalt, zinc, and nickel. Ferroportin may also function as a manganese exporter.

== Tissue distribution ==
Ferroportin is found on the basolateral membranes of intestinal epithelia of mammals, including:

- Enterocytes in the duodenum
- Hepatocytes
- Macrophages of the reticuloendothelial system
- Adipocytes

== Role in development ==
Ferroportin-1 plays an important role in neural tube closure and forebrain patterning. Mouse embryos lacking the Slc40a1 gene are aborted before gastrulation occurs, suggesting that the Fpn1 protein encoded is necessary and essential for normal embryonic development. Fpn1 is expressed in the syncytiotrophoblast cells in the placenta and visceral endoderm of mice at E7.5. Further, several retrospective studies have noted an increased incidence of spina bifida occurring after low maternal intake of iron during embryonic and fetal development.

A study examining the consequences of several different mutations of the Slc40a1 mouse gene suggested that several serious neural tube and patterning defects were produced as a result, including spina bifida, exencephaly, and forebrain truncations, among others. Given the findings of studies to date, there appears to be significant evidence that intact iron transport mechanisms are critical to normal neural tube closure. Furthermore, other experiments have suggested that Fpn1 product and activity is required along the entire anterior-posterior axis of the animal to ensure proper closure of the neural tube.

== Role in fertility ==
It is known that ferroportin (SLC40A1) gene is expressed at a low level in infertile women. Its mRNA levels were discovered to be down-regulated in these women, specifically in granulosa cells. What's more, low expression of ferroportin is also associated with infertility when some features like age and smoking habits are considered. It is also important to mention that, not only is ferroportin down-regulated in granulosa cells, but also in cervical cells of infertile women, and that the association between infertility and low ferroportin levels in these cells can be seen, again, when mRNA ferroportin levels was adjusted by age and smoking status.

== Role in iron metabolism ==
Ferroportin is inhibited by hepcidin, which binds to ferroportin and internalizes it within the cell. This results in the retention of iron within enterocytes, hepatocytes, and macrophages with a consequent reduction in iron levels within the blood serum. This is especially significant with enterocytes which, when shed at the end of their lifespan, results in significant iron loss. Hepcidin is synthesized in response to various cytokines, as described in the Hepcidin article, as well as in this article by Ganz.

Ferroportin expression is also regulated by the IRP regulatory mechanism. If the iron concentration is too low, the IRP concentration increases, thus inhibiting the ferroportin translation and increasing intracellular iron and ferritin concentrations. The ferroportin translation is also down regulated post-transcriptionally by the micro RNA miR-485-3p, which is produced in response to iron deficiency.

== Clinical significance ==
Mutations in the ferroportin gene are known to cause an autosomal dominant form of iron overload known as Hemochromatosis type 4 or Ferroportin Disease. The effects of the mutations are generally not severe but a spectrum of clinical outcomes are seen with different mutations. Ferroportin is also associated with African iron overload. Ferroportin and hepcidin are critical proteins for the regulation of systemic iron homeostasis.

== Protein family ==
Ferroportin

Identifiers
- Symbol: FPN
- Pfam: PF06963
- InterPro: IPR009716
- TCDB: 2.A.100
Available protein structures:
- PDB: IPR009716 PF06963 (ECOD; PDBsum)
- AlphaFold: IPR009716; PF06963

Ferroportin is part of the ferroportin (Fpn) family. Members of the family are found across eukaryotes in animals and plants as well as in Proteobacteria, a group of bacteria.
