= Fet3p =

Fet3p is a multicopper oxidase (MCO)_{2} found in Saccharomyces cerevisiae with a structure consisting of three cupredoxin-like β-barrel domains and four copper ions located in three distinct metal sites (T1 in domain 3, T2, and the binuclear T3 at the interface between domains 1 and 3). Fet3p is a type I membrane protein with an orientation that places the amino-terminal oxidase domain in the exocellular space (N_{exo}) and the carboxyl terminus in the cytoplasm (C_{cyt}).

Part of the ferroxidase reaction, Fet3p catalyzes the oxidation of Fe(II) to Fe(III) using O_{2} as substrate. The Fe(III) generated by Fet3p is a ligand for the iron permease, Ftr1p.
