= Laccase =

Class of enzymes

Identifiers
- EC no.: 1.10.3.2
- CAS no.: 80498-15-3

Databases
- BRENDA: enzyme data
- ExPASy: NiceZyme view
- KEGG: enzyme entry
- MetaCyc: metabolic pathway
- Rhea: reactions
- PDB structures: RCSB PDB PDBe PDBsum
- Gene Ontology: AmiGO / QuickGO
Search
- PMC: articles
- PubMed: articles
- NCBI: proteins

Laccases (EC 1.10.3.2) are multicopper oxidases found in plants, fungi, and bacteria. Laccases oxidize a variety of phenolic substrates, performing one-electron oxidations, leading to crosslinking. For example, laccases play a role in the formation of lignin by promoting the oxidative coupling of monolignols, a family of naturally occurring phenols. Other laccases, such as those produced by the fungus Pleurotus ostreatus, play a role in the degradation of lignin, and can therefore be classed as lignin-modifying enzymes. Other laccases produced by fungi can facilitate the biosynthesis of melanin pigments. Laccases catalyze ring cleavage of aromatic compounds.

Laccase was first studied by Hikorokuro Yoshida in 1883 and then by Gabriel Bertrand in 1894 in the sap of the Japanese lacquer tree, where it helps to form lacquer, hence the name laccase.

== Active site ==
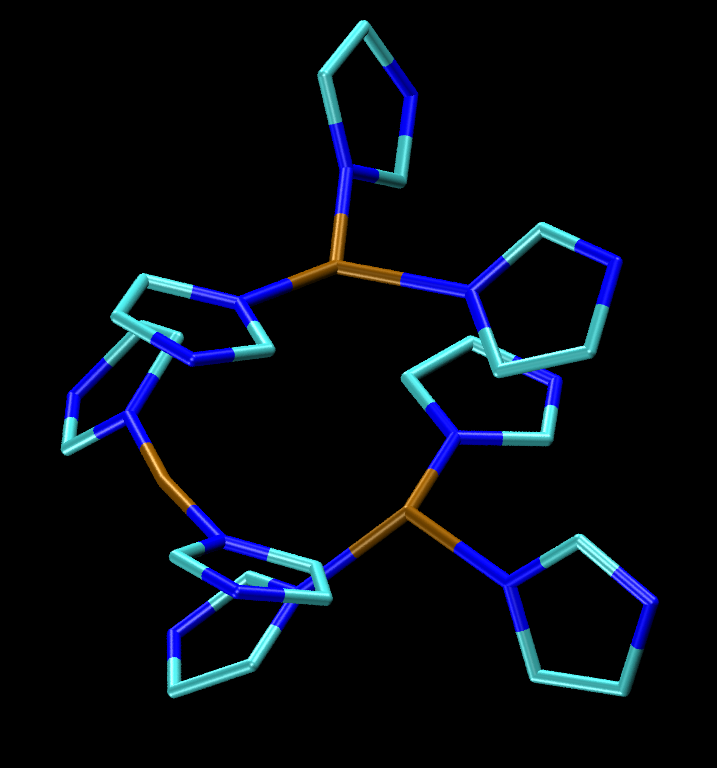
The tricopper site found in many laccases; note that each copper center is bound to the imidazole sidechains of histidines (color code: copper is brown, nitrogen is blue).

The active site consists of four copper centers, which adopt structures classified as type I, type II, and type III. A tricopper ensemble contains types II and III copper (see figure). It is this center that binds O_{2} and reduces it to water. Each Cu(I,II) couple delivers one electron required for this conversion. The type I copper does not bind O_{2}, but functions solely as an electron transfer site. The type I copper center consists of a single copper atom that is ligated to a minimum of two histidine residues and a single cysteine residue, but in some laccases produced by certain plants and bacteria, the type I copper center contains an additional methionine ligand. The type III copper center consists of two copper atoms that each possess three histidine ligands and are linked to one another via a hydroxide bridging ligand. The final copper center is the type II copper center, which has two histidine ligands and a hydroxide ligand. The type II together with the type III copper center forms the tricopper ensemble, which is where dioxygen reduction takes place. The type III copper can be replaced by Hg(II), which causes a decrease in laccase activity. Cyanide removes all copper from the enzyme, and re-embedding with type I and type II copper has been shown to be impossible. Type III copper, however, can be re-embedded back into the enzyme. A variety of other anions inhibit laccase.

Laccases affects the oxygen reduction reaction at low overpotentials. The enzyme has been examined as the cathode in enzymatic biofuel cells. They can be paired with an electron mediator to facilitate electron transfer to a solid electrode wire. Laccases are some of the few oxidoreductases commercialized as industrial catalysts.

== Activity in wheat dough ==
Laccases have the potential to crosslink food polymers such as proteins and nonstarch polysaccharides in dough. In non-starch polysaccharides, such as arabinoxylans (AX), laccase catalyzes the oxidative gelation of feruloylated arabinoxylans by dimerization of their ferulic esters. These cross-links have been found to greatly increase the maximum resistance and decrease extensibility of the dough. The resistance was increased due to the crosslinking of AX via ferulic acid and resulting in a strong AX and gluten network. Although laccase is known to crosslink AX, under the microscope it was found that the laccase also acted on the flour proteins. Oxidation of the ferulic acid on AX to form ferulic acid radicals increased the oxidation rate of free SH groups on the gluten proteins and thus influenced the formation of S-S bonds between gluten polymers. Laccase is also able to oxidize peptide-bound tyrosine, but very poorly. Because of the increased strength of the dough, it showed irregular bubble formation during proofing. This was a result of the gas (carbon dioxide) becoming trapped within the crust so it could not diffuse out (like it would have normally) and causing abnormal pore size. Resistance and extensibility was a function of dosage, but at very high dosage the dough showed contradictory results: maximum resistance was reduced drastically. The high dosage may have caused extreme changes in the structure of dough, resulting in incomplete gluten formation. Another reason is that it may mimic overmixing, causing negative effects on gluten structure. Laccase-treated dough had low stability over prolonged storage. The dough became softer and this is related to laccase mediation. The laccase-mediated radical mechanism creates secondary reactions of FA-derived radicals that result in breaking of covalent linkages in AX and weakening of the AX gel.

== Potential applications ==
Due to the ability of laccase to catalyze oxidation reactions of a range of substrates, the use of laccase as a biocatalyst in different industrial applications have been investigated. Laccases have been applied in the production of wines. Laccase is produced by a number of fungal species that can infect grapes, most notably Botrytis cinerea Pers. (1794). Laccase is active at wine pH and its activity is not readily suppressed by sulfur dioxide. It has been noted to cause oxidative browning in white wines and loss of colour in red wines. It can also degrade a number of key phenolic compounds critical to wine quality. Aside from wine, laccases are of interest in the food industry, including food packaging.

The ability of laccases to modify complex organic molecules has attracted attention in the area of organic synthesis.

Laccases have been also been studied as catalysts in bioremediation to degrade emerging pollutants and pharmaceuticals.
