= Hereditary haemochromatosis =

Genetic condition involving iron buildup

Haemochromatosis type 1
- Other names: HFE hereditary haemochromatosis HFE-related hereditary haemochromatosis
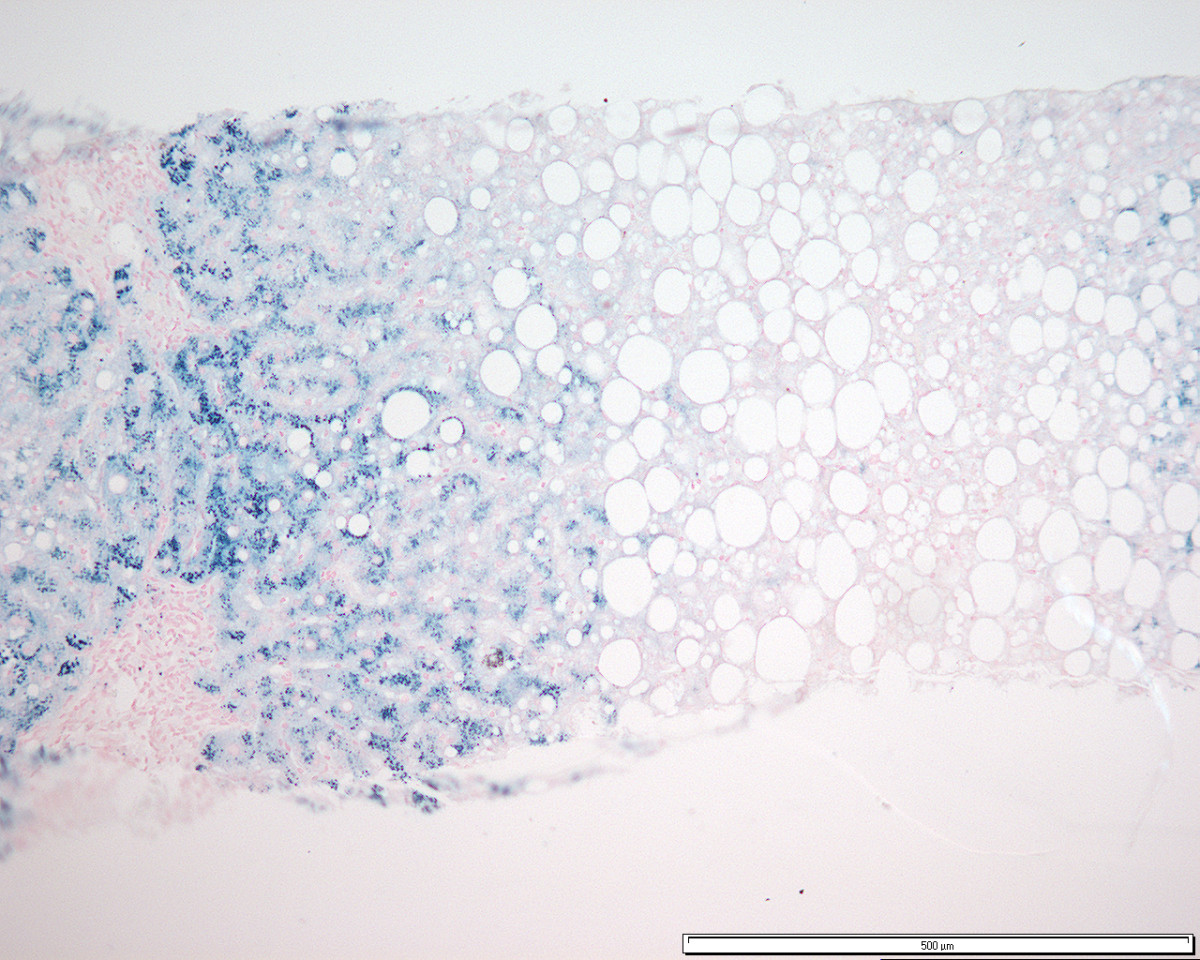
- Iron accumulation demonstrated by Prussian blue staining in a patient with homozygous genetic haemochromatosis (microscopy, 10x magnified): Parts of normal pink tissue are scarcely present.
- Specialty: Endocrinology, hepatology
- Differential diagnosis: Haemochromatosis type 2, 3, 4, 5; Secondary haemochromatosis; Aceruloplasminemia. Atransferrinemia

Hereditary haemochromatosis type 1 (HFE-related haemochromatosis) is a genetic disorder characterized by excessive intestinal absorption of dietary iron, resulting in a pathological increase in total body iron stores. Humans, like most animals, have no mechanism to regulate excess iron, simply losing a limited amount through various means like sweating or menstruating.

Excess iron accumulates in tissues and organs, disrupting their normal function. The most susceptible organs include the liver, heart, pancreas, skin, joints, gonads, thyroid and pituitary gland; patients can present with cirrhosis, polyarthropathy, hypogonadism, heart failure, or diabetes.

There are five types of hereditary haemochromatosis: type 1, 2 (2A, 2B), 3, 4 and 5, all caused by mutated genes. Hereditary haemochromatosis type 1 is the most frequent, and uniquely related to the HFE gene. It is most common among those of Northern European ancestry, in particular those of Celtic descent.

The disease follows an autosomal recessive pattern of inheritance, meaning that an individual must inherit two copies of the mutated gene involved in each cell to develop the condition. In most cases, when a person has this autosomal recessive condition, their parents have acted as hereditary carriers, possessing one copy of the mutated gene but not manifesting any signs or symptoms associated with the disease. The unaffected carrier parents play an integral role in transmitting one copy of the mutated gene to their child, who ultimately develops the disease. However, carriers may experience iron overload themselves at a later stage if certain factors come into play. Still, in most cases, they remain asymptomatic throughout their lives unless other genetic or environmental factors contribute to excessive iron accumulation within their bodies.

== Signs and symptoms ==
Haemochromatosis is protean in its manifestations, i.e., often presenting with signs or symptoms suggestive of other diagnoses that affect specific organ systems. Many of the signs and symptoms below are uncommon, and most patients with the hereditary form of haemochromatosis do not show any overt signs of disease nor do they have premature morbidity, if they are diagnosed early, but, more often than not, the condition is diagnosed only at autopsy.

Presently, the classic triad of cirrhosis, bronze skin, and diabetes is less common because of earlier diagnosis.

The more common clinical manifestations include:

- Fatigue
- Malaise
- Joint pain (mainly knee and hand)
- Abdominal pain
- Bronze or gray skin color (for this the illness was named "bronze diabetes" when it was first described by Armand Trousseau in 1865)
- Liver fibrosis or cirrhosis (with an increased risk of hepatocellular carcinoma): Liver disease is always preceded by evidence of liver dysfunction, including elevated serum enzymes specific to the liver, clubbing of the fingers, leuconychia, asterixis, hepatomegaly, palmar erythema, and spider naevi. Cirrhosis can also present with jaundice (yellowing of the skin) and ascites.
- Diabetes mellitus type 2: HH patients have insulin resistance for liver disease, and poor insulin secretion due to pancreatic damage from iron deposition.
- Erectile dysfunction and hypogonadism, resulting in decreased libido, amenorrhea
- Congestive heart failure, abnormal heart rhythms, or pericarditis
- Arthritis of the hands (especially the second and third metacarpophalangeal joints), but also the knee and shoulder joints
- Weight loss

Less common findings including:

- Memory loss
- Hair loss
- Splenomegaly
- Adrenal insufficiency
- Deafness
- Dyskinesias, including Parkinsonian symptoms
- Dysfunction of certain endocrine organs:
  - Parathyroid gland (leading to hypocalcaemia)
  - Pituitary gland: secondary hypothyroidism, secondary hypogonadism
  - Adrenal gland
- An increased susceptibility to certain infectious diseases caused by siderophilic microorganisms:
  - Vibrio vulnificus infections from eating seafood or wound infection
  - Listeria monocytogenes
  - Yersinia enterocolica
  - Salmonella enterica (serotype Typhymurium)
  - Klebsiella pneumoniae
  - Escherichia coli
  - Rhizopus arrhizus
  - Mucor species
  - Aspergillus fumigatus
  - Cytomegalovirus
  - Hepatitis B virus
  - Hepatitis C virus

In the hereditary hemochromatosis (HH or HHC), males are usually diagnosed after their forties and fifties, and women some decades later, during menopause. The severity of clinical disease varies considerably. Some evidence suggests that hereditary haemochromatosis patients affected with other liver ailments such as hepatitis or alcoholic liver disease have worse liver disease than those with either condition alone. Also, juvenile form of primary haemochromatosis (Hemochromatosis type 2) present in childhood with the same consequences of iron overload.

=== End-organ damage ===
Iron is stored in the liver, pancreas and heart. Long-term effects of haemochromatosis on these organs can be serious, even fatal when untreated.

Since the liver is a primary storage area for iron and naturally accumulates excess iron over time, it is likely to be damaged by iron overload. Toxins may accumulate in the blood and eventually affect mental functioning due to increased risk of hepatic encephalopathy. Together, they can increase the risk of liver cancer to one in three persons.

If excess iron in the heart interferes with its ability to circulate enough blood, a number of problems can occur, including (potentially fatal) congestive heart failure. The condition may be reversible when haemochromatosis is treated and excess iron stores are reduced. Arrhythmia or abnormal heart rhythm can cause heart palpitations, chest pain, and light-headedness, and is occasionally life-threatening. This condition can often be reversed with treatment.

The pancreas, which also stores iron, is very important in the body's mechanisms for sugar metabolism. Diabetes affects the way the body uses blood sugar (glucose), and diabetes is, in turn, the leading cause of new blindness in adults and may be involved in kidney failure.

Haemochromatosis may lead to cirrhosis and its complications, including bleeding from dilated veins in the esophagus (esophageal varices) and stomach (gastric varices) and severe fluid retention in the abdomen (ascites). Severity of periodontal disease is associated with high transferrin saturation in haemochromatosis patients.

== Genetics ==
The regulation of dietary iron absorption is complex and understanding is incomplete. One of the better-characterized genes responsible for hereditary haemochromatosis is HFE on chromosome 6, which codes for a transmembrane protein involved in the induction of hepcidin expression upon high iron load. The HFE gene has three often observed genetic variants:

- rs1799945, c.187C>G, p.His63Asp (H63D);
- rs1800562, c.845G>A, p. Cys282Tyr (C282Y);
- rs1800730, c.193A>T, p.Ser65Cys (S65C).

The worldwide prevalence rates for H63D, C282Y and S65C (minor allele frequencies) are 10%, 3% and 1% respectively.

The C282Y allele is a transition point mutation from guanine to adenine at nucleotide 845 in HFE, resulting in a missense mutation that replaces the cysteine residue at position 282 with a tyrosine amino acid. Heterozygotes for either allele can manifest clinical iron overload, if they have two of any alleles. This combination makes them compound heterozygous for haemochromatosis and puts them greatly at risk of storing excess iron in the body. Homozygosity for the C282Y genetic variant is the most common genotype responsible for clinical iron accumulation, though heterozygosity for C282Y/H63D variants, so-called compound heterozygotes, results in clinically evident iron overload. Considerable debate exists regarding the penetrance—the probability of clinical expression of the trait given the genotype— for clinical disease in homozygotes. Most males homozygous for HFE C282Y show at least one manifestation of iron-storage disease by middle age. Individuals with the relevant genetic variants may never develop iron overload. Phenotypic expression is present in 10-33% of C282Y homozygotes with less than 10% going on to experience severe iron overload and organ damage, and biochemical expression is present in 38-50%. Although this condition has autosomal recessive inheritance, there has been at least one individual with heterozygous C282Y experienced iron overload symptoms reported. Researchers have suspected a digenic condition (with mutations of other gene locus, such as HAMP, HJV, TFR2), or environmental factors.

The H63D variant is just a gene polymorphism, and if there are no other changes, it may not have clinical significance. In a 2014 study, H63D homozygosity was associated with an elevated mean ferritin level, but only 6.7% had documented iron overload at follow-up. As about the people with one copy of the H63D alteration (heterozygous carriers), this genotype is very unlikely to cause a clinical presentation, there is no predictable risk of iron overload. Besides that, two 2020 studies revealed that the frequency of homozygous or heterozygous H63D variant is significantly higher in elite endurance athletes comparing to ethnically matched controls, and is associated with high V̇O_{2max} in male athletes.

Each patient with the susceptible genotype accumulates iron at different rates depending on iron intake, the exact nature of the genetic variant, and the presence of other insults to the liver, such as alcohol and viral disease. As such, the degree to which the liver and other organs are affected is highly variable and is dependent on these factors and co-morbidities, as well as age at which they are studied for manifestations of disease. Penetrance differs between populations.

Disease-causing genetic variants of the HFE gene account for 90% of the cases of non-transfusion iron overload.

This gene is closely linked to the HLA-A3 locus.

== Pathophysiology ==
The normal distribution of body iron stores

Since the regulation of iron metabolism is still poorly understood, a clear model of how haemochromatosis operates is still not available. A working model describes the defect in the HFE gene, where a mutation puts the intestinal absorption of iron into overdrive. Normally, HFE facilitates the binding of transferrin, which is iron's carrier protein in the blood. Transferrin levels are typically elevated at times of iron depletion (low ferritin stimulates the release of transferrin from the liver). When transferrin is high, HFE works to increase the intestinal release of iron into the blood. When HFE is mutated, the intestines perpetually interpret a strong transferrin signal as if the body were deficient in iron. This false signal leads to maximal iron absorption from ingested foods and iron overload in the tissues. However, HFE is only part of the story, since many patients with mutated HFE do not manifest clinical iron overload, and some patients with iron overload have a normal HFE genotype. A possible explanation is the fact that HFE normally plays a role in the production of hepcidin in the liver, a function that is impaired in HFE mutations.

People with abnormal iron regulatory genes do not reduce their absorption of iron in response to increased iron levels in the body. Thus, the iron stores of the body increase. As they increase, the iron which is initially stored as ferritin is deposited in organs as haemosiderin and this is toxic to tissue, probably at least partially by inducing oxidative stress. Iron is a pro-oxidant. Thus, haemochromatosis shares common symptomology (e.g., cirrhosis and dyskinetic symptoms) with other "pro-oxidant" diseases such as Wilson's disease, chronic manganese poisoning, and hyperuricaemic syndrome in Dalmatian dogs. The latter also experience "bronzing".

== Diagnosis ==
The diagnosis of haemochromatosis is often made following the incidental finding on routine blood screening of elevated serum liver enzymes or elevation of the transferrin saturation or elevated serum ferritin. Arthropathy with stiff joints, diabetes, or fatigue, may be the presenting complaint.

=== Blood tests ===
Serum ferritin and fasting transferrin saturation are commonly used as screening for haemochromatosis. Transferrin binds iron and is responsible for iron transport in the blood. Measuring ferritin provides a crude measure of iron stores in the body. Fasting transferrin saturation values in excess of 45%, and the serum ferritin more than 250 ug/L in males and 200 ug/L in females are recognized as a threshold for further evaluation of haemochromatosis. Other source says that the normal values for males are 30-400 ng/mL and for female, 13-150 ng/mL. Fasting transferrin saturation is a better test to detect HH. Transferrin saturation greater than 62% is suggestive of homozygosity for mutations in the HFE gene.

Ferritin, a protein synthesized by the liver, is the primary form of iron storage within cells and tissues. Measuring ferritin provides a crude estimate of whole-body iron stores, though is raised in many conditions, particularly inflammatory conditions. Examples of causes for raised serum ferritin include but are not limited to: infection, chronic alcohol consumption (mainly >20g/day), liver disease, cancer, porphyria, Hemophagocytic lymphohistiocytosis, hyperthyroidism, obesity, metabolic syndrome, diabetes, several blood transfusions, too many iron supplements, aceruloplasminemia, atransferrinemia, hyperferritinemia cataract syndrome and others. Proinflammatory states account for up to 90% of raised ferritin. Serum ferritin in excess of 1000 ng/mL of blood is almost always attributable to haemochromatosis.

=== Liver biopsy ===
Liver biopsies involve taking a sample of tissue from the liver, using a thin needle. The amount of iron in the sample is then quantified and compared to normal, and evidence of liver damage, especially cirrhosis, is measured microscopically. Formerly, this was the only way to confirm a diagnosis of haemochromatosis. Risks of biopsy include bruising, bleeding, and infection. Now, when a history, measures of transferrin saturation and ferritin, and MRI (R2*/T2*) point to haemochromatosis, a liver biopsy is not necessary to quantify the amount of accumulated iron. Liver biopsy is the gold standard for detecting and quantifying hepatic fibrosis.

=== MRI ===
MRI-based testing is a noninvasive and accurate alternative to measure liver iron concentrations (LIC) and hepatic fibrosis.

=== Other imaging ===
Clinically, the disease may be silent, but characteristic radiological features may point to the diagnosis. The increased iron stores in the organs involved, especially in the liver and pancreas, result in characteristic findings on unenhanced CT, but it is not good for detecting tissue iron. Haemochromatosis arthropathy includes degenerative osteoarthritis and chondrocalcinosis. The distribution of the arthropathy is distinctive, but not unique, frequently affecting the second and third metacarpophalangeal joints of the hand. The arthropathy can, therefore, be a clue as to the diagnosis of haemochromatosis.

=== Functional testing ===
Based on the history, a physician might consider specific tests to monitor organ dysfunction, such as an echocardiogram for heart failure, or blood glucose monitoring for patients with haemochromatosis diabetes.

=== Stages ===
The American Association for the Study of Liver Diseases suggests the following three stages for the condition (identified by the European Association for the Study of Liver Diseases):

1. Genetic susceptibility but no iron overload. Individuals who have the genetic disorder only.
2. Iron overload but no organ or tissue damage.
3. Organ or tissue damage as a result of iron deposition.

Individuals at each stage do not necessarily progress on to the next stage, and end stage disease is more common in males.

=== Differential diagnosis ===
Other causes of excess iron accumulation exist, which have to be considered before haemochromatosis type 1 is diagnosed.

- Haemochromatosis type 2.
- Haemochromatosis type 3.
- Haemochromatosis type 4.
- Haemochromatosis type 5.
- African iron overload, formerly known as Bantu siderosis, was first observed among people of African descent in Southern Africa. Originally, this was blamed on ungalvanised barrels used to store home-made beer, which led to increased oxidation and increased iron levels in the beer. Further investigation has shown that only some people drinking this sort of beer get iron overload syndrome, and that a similar syndrome occurred in people of African descent who have had no contact with this kind of beer (e.g., African Americans). This led investigators to the discovery of a gene polymorphism in the gene for ferroportin, which predisposes some people of African descent to iron overload.
- Secondary hemochromatosis: its main cause is the Transfusional haemosiderosis. It is the accumulation of iron, mainly in the liver, in patients who receive frequent blood transfusions (such as those with thalassaemia). Other causes are: sideroblastic anemia, congenital dyserythropoietic anemia, pyruvate kinase deficiency, chronic hemolytic anemia, chronic liver disease (hepatitis B, hepatitis C, cirrhosis, alcoholic fatty liver disease), overdose of oral iron pills or iron injections, long-time kidney dialysis, and dyserythropoiesis, also known as myelodysplastic syndrome. It is a disorder in the production of red blood cells that leads to increased iron recycling from the bone marrow and accumulation in the liver.
- Other causes of secondary iron overload: Aceruloplasminemia, Atransferrinemia, Neonatal hemochromatosis (GALD-NH), GRACILE syndrome, Dysmetabolic iron overload syndrome (DIOS)
- Porphyria cutanea tarda
- Hyperferritinemia without iron overload caused by infections (eg. COVID-19), cancer, inflammation, hyperferritinemia dysmetabolic

== Screening ==
Standard diagnostic measures for haemochromatosis, transferrin saturation and ferritin tests, are not a part of routine medical testing. Screening for haemochromatosis is recommended if the patient has a parent, child, or sibling with the disease.

Routine screening of the general population for hereditary haemochromatosis is generally not done. Mass genetic screening has been evaluated by the U.S. Preventive Services Task Force, among other groups, which recommended against genetic screening of the general population for hereditary haemochromatosis because the likelihood of discovering an undiagnosed patient with clinically relevant iron overload is less than one in 1,000. Although strong evidence shows that treatment of iron overload can save lives in patients with transfusional iron overload, no clinical study has shown that for asymptomatic carriers of hereditary haemochromatosis treatment with venesection (phlebotomy) provides any clinical benefit. Recently, patients are suggested to be screened for iron overload using serum ferritin as a marker. If serum ferritin exceeds 1000 ng/mL, iron overload is very likely the cause.

== Treatment ==
=== Phlebotomy ===
Early diagnosis is vital, as the late effects of iron accumulation can be wholly prevented by periodic phlebotomies (by venesection) comparable in volume to blood donations.

Phlebotomy (or bloodletting) is usually done at a weekly or each two weeks interval until ferritin levels are 50-100 μg/L. To prevent iron reaccumulation, subsequent phlebotomies are normally carried out about once every three to four months for males, and twice a year for females to keep the serum ferritin between 50 and 100 μg/L. This treatment can have the side effect of altering trace element metabolism, including changes in the blood concentrations of potentially toxic elements such as cadmium and lead.

=== Iron chelation therapy ===
Where venesection is not possible, long-term administration of an iron chelator as Deferoxamine (or Desferrioxamine), Deferasirox and Deferiprone is useful. Deferoxamine is an iron-chelating compound, and excretion induced by deferoxamine is enhanced by administration of vitamin C. It cannot be used during pregnancy or breast-feeding due to risk of defects in the child.

=== Organ damage ===
- Treatment of organ damage (heart failure with diuretics and ACE inhibitor therapy). Hepatic transplantation in patients with liver failure.

=== Diet ===
- Limiting intake of alcoholic beverages, high iron fortified foods such as certain cereals and supplements, vitamin C (increases iron absorption in the gut), heme iron animal products (high in iron), and potential causes of food poisoning (shellfish, raw seafood)
- Increasing intake of substances that inhibit iron absorption, such as high-tannin tea, calcium, black or green teas, and foods containing oxalic and phytic acids (such as collard greens, which must be consumed at the same time as the iron-containing foods to be effective)

=== Chelating polymers ===
A novel experimental approach to the hereditary haemochromatosis treatment is the maintenance therapy with polymeric chelators. These polymers or particles have a negligible or null systemic biological availability and they are designed to form stable complexes with Fe^{2+} and Fe^{3+} in the GIT and thus limiting the uptake of these ions and their long-term accumulation. Although this method has only a limited efficacy, unlike small-molecular chelators, such an approach has virtually no side effects in sub-chronic studies. Interestingly, the simultaneous chelation of Fe^{2+} and Fe^{3+} increases the treatment efficacy.

== Prognosis ==
Persons with symptomatic haemochromatosis have somewhat reduced life expectancy compared to the general population, mainly due to excess mortality from cirrhosis and liver cancer. Patients who were treated with phlebotomy lived longer than those who were not. Patients without liver disease or diabetes had similar survival rate to the general population.

== Epidemiology ==
Haemochromatosis is one of the most common heritable genetic conditions in people of Northern Europe, with a prevalence of 1:200. The disease has a variable penetration, and about one in 10 people of this demographic carry a mutation in one of the genes regulating iron metabolism. In the U.S., the frequency of the C282Y and H63D mutations is 5.4% and 13.5%, respectively. Whereas, the worldwide frequency of the C282Y and H63D mutations is about 1.9% and 8.1%, respectively, so mutation in H63D allele are more than C282Y allele. The prevalence of mutations in iron-metabolism genes varies in different populations. A study of 3,011 unrelated white Australians found that 14% were heterozygous carriers of an HFE mutation, 0.5% were homozygous for an HFE mutation, and only 0.25% of the study population had clinically relevant iron overload. Most patients who are homozygous for HFE mutations do not manifest clinically relevant haemochromatosis (see Genetics above). Other populations have a lower prevalence of both the genetic mutation and the clinical disease. It is the most frequent genetic disease in the U.S. with a prevalence of 1:300 in the non-Hispanic white population, It is 2–3 times more common in males.

Genetics studies suggest the original haemochromatosis mutation arose in a single person, possibly of Celtic ethnicity, who lived 60–70 generations ago. At that time, when dietary iron may have been scarcer than today, the presence of the mutant allele may have provided an evolutionary advantage by maintaining higher iron levels in the blood.

The distribution of the C282Y variant was noted in various countries. Non-HFE associated hemochromatosis, as Haemochromatosis type 2, Haemochromatosis type 3, Haemochromatosis type 4 and Haemochromatosis type 5, were discovered in Mediterranean countries. On the other side, Northern European ancestry is closely linked to hereditary hemochromatosis disease (HFE). In one study, over 93% of Irish patients with HFE C282Y mutation were homozygotic. The G320V mutation in the HJV gene, which produces hemojuvelin protein, is widely distributed in central Europe and Greece.

== Terminology ==
The term "haemochromatosis" is used by different sources in many different ways.

It is often used to imply an association with the HFE gene. For many years, HFE was the only known gene associated with haemochromatosis, and the term "hereditary haemochromatosis" was used to describe haemochromatosis type 1. However, many different genetic associations with this condition are now known. The older the text, or the more general the audience, the more likely that HFE is implied. "Haemochromatosis" has also been used in contexts where a genetic cause for iron accumulation had not been known. In some cases, however, a condition that was thought to be due to diet or environment was later linked to a genetic polymorphism, as in African iron overload.

== History ==
In 1847, Virchow described a golden brown granular pigment that was soluble in sulfuric acid and produced red ash on ignition. The disease was first described in 1865 by Armand Trousseau in a report on diabetes in patients presenting with a bronze pigmentation of their skin. Two years later, Perls developed the first practical method for the analysis of iron in tissue. Despite Trousseau not associating diabetes with iron accumulation, the recognition that infiltration of the pancreas with iron might disrupt endocrine function resulting in diabetes was made by Friedrich Daniel von Recklinghausen in 1890. In 1935, English gerontologist Joseph Sheldon described the cases of haemochromatosis. He established this as the name of the disorder and his detailed monograph. Despite lacking the modern molecular techniques accessible today, he came to accurate conclusions that describe haemochromatosis disease as an inborn error of metabolism where this inherited disorder can increase the absorption of iron and thus cause tissue damage due to iron deposition. Moreover, he rejected theories that alcohol, drug, and other factors contribute to the disorder.

The clinical case series from 1935 to 1955 indicated that haemochromatosis was more common than had been acknowledged. During the 1960s, MacDonald, a pathologist at Boston City Hospital, diverted attention away from the true cause of haemochromatosis. He believed that haemochromatosis was a nutritional condition because he observed many drunken patients of Irish ancestry. During this period of time, other investigators reported additional evidence suggesting that a genetic factor could strongly influence the absorption of iron in people with haemochromatosis. However, alcohol consumption is known to increase the risk of liver injury in haemochromatosis. This finding is consistent with the concept that excess iron metabolism is a primary cause of haemochromatosis disease.

Finally, in 1976, Marcel Simon and his collaborators confirmed that haemochromatosis is an autosomal recessive disorder that has a link to the human leukocyte antigen (HLA) region of the genome. It took 20 years for researchers at Mercator Genetics to effectively identify and clone the haemochromatosis genes using a positional cloning approach.

In 1996, Feder et al. identified HFE, which is a major histocompatibility complex (MHC) gene. They found that 83% of patients have homozygosity for a missense mutation (C282Y) in the HFE gene. Finally, several groups reported their findings in a series of patients with haemochromatosis where they discovered the existence of the C282Y mutation in about 85-90% of the cases. The discovery has led to improved clinical medicine and liver disease evaluation.
