= Iron overload =

Abnormal accumulation of iron in the body

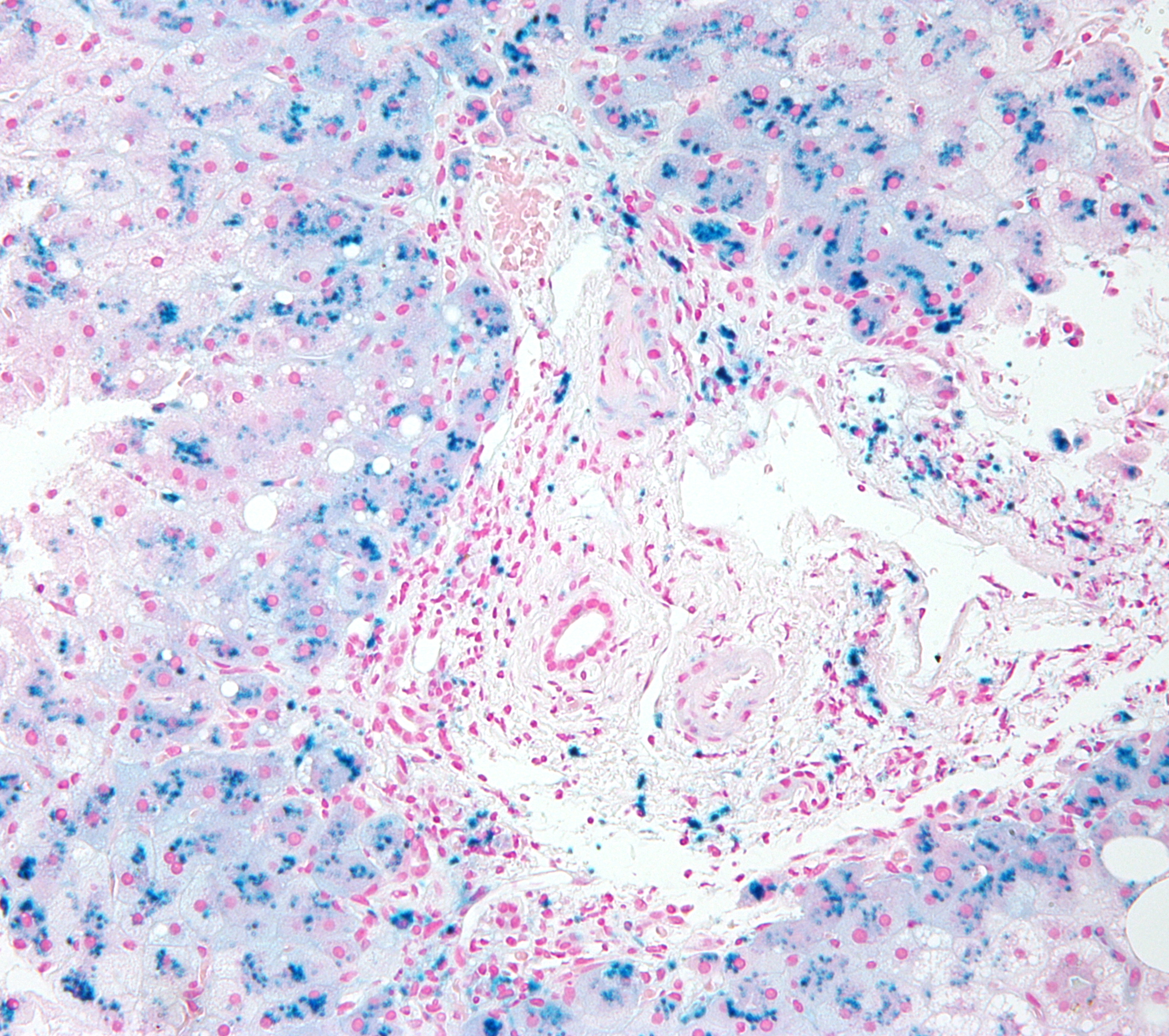
- Micrograph of liver biopsy showing iron deposits due to haemosiderosis. Iron stain.
- Specialty: Hematology, gastroenterology/hepatology

Iron overload is the abnormal and increased accumulation of total iron in the body, leading to organ damage. The primary mechanism of organ damage is oxidative stress, as elevated intracellular iron levels increase free radical formation via the Fenton reaction. Iron overload is often primary (i.e., hereditary haemochromatosis, aceruloplasminemia) but may also be secondary to other causes (i.e., transfusional iron overload). Iron deposition most commonly occurs in the liver, pancreas, skin, heart, and joints.

People with iron overload classically present with the triad of liver cirrhosis, secondary diabetes mellitus, and bronze skin. However, due to earlier detection nowadays, symptoms are often limited to general chronic malaise, arthralgia, and hepatomegaly.

== Signs and symptoms ==
Organs most commonly affected by hemochromatosis include the liver, heart, and endocrine glands.

Hemochromatosis may present with the following clinical syndromes:

- liver: chronic liver disease and cirrhosis of the liver.
- heart: heart failure, cardiac arrhythmia.
- hormones: diabetes (see below) and hypogonadism (insufficiency of the sex hormone producing glands) which leads to low sex drive and/or loss of fertility in men and loss of fertility and menstrual cycle in women.
- metabolism: diabetes in people with iron overload occurs as a result of selective iron deposition in islet beta cells in the pancreas leading to functional failure and cell death.
- skeletal: arthritis, from iron deposition in joints leading to joint pains. The most commonly affected joints are those of the hands, particularly the knuckles or metacarpophalangeal joints, wrists or radiocarpal joints, elbow, hip, knee, and ankle joints. Risk factors for the development of arthritis in those with hemochromatosis include elevated iron levels (ferritin greater than 1000 or transferrin saturation greater than 50%) for an extended period, increasing age, and concurrent advanced liver fibrosis.
- skin: melanoderma (darkening or 'bronzing' of the skin).

Hemochromatosis leading to secondary diabetes (through iron deposition in the insulin secreting beta cells of the pancreas), when combined with a bronzing or darkening of the skin, is sometimes known as "bronze diabetes".

== Causes ==
The term hemochromatosis was initially used to refer to what is now more specifically called hemochromatosis type 1 (HFE-related hereditary hemochromatosis or classical hereditary hemochromatosis). Currently, hemochromatosis (without further specification) is mostly defined as iron overload with a hereditary or primary cause, or originating from a metabolic disorder.

=== Primary hemochromatosis and hemosiderosis ===
==== Hereditary hemochromatosis ====
Hereditary hemochromatoses (HH or HHC) are genetic disorders. Hereditary hemochromatosis type 1 (HH type 1) is caused by mutations of HFE gene, mainly C282Y/C282Y mutation. This mutation is present in 1:200-300 of the Caucasian population in the United States and Northern Europe with lower incidence in other ethnic groups, but only 10-33% (clinical penetrance) of them will develop iron overload. Mutations of the HFE gene (homeostatic iron regulator) located on chromosome 6 (responsible for iron regulatory protein hepcidin regulation) are responsible for most cases of hereditary hemochromatosis; 80-90% of cases of hereditary hemochromatosis involve a mutation of this HFE gene; 90-95% in Northern Europe. Non-HFE hereditary hemochromatosis involves mutations in genes coding for the iron regulatory proteins hemojuvelin, transferrin receptor-2, ferroportin, and HAMP.

Hereditary hemochromatosis is characterized by an accelerated rate of intestinal iron absorption and progressive iron deposition in various tissues. This typically begins to be expressed in the third to fifth decades of life, but may occur in children. The clinical presentation of hepatic cirrhosis, hypogonadism, cardiomyopathy, diabetes, arthritis, or hyperpigmentation is uncommon in current patients. Because of the severe sequelae of this disorder if left untreated, and recognizing that treatment is relatively simple, early diagnosis before symptoms or signs appear is important.

==== Hemosiderosis ====
In general, the term hemosiderosis is used to indicate the pathological effect of iron accumulation in any given organ, which mainly occurs in the form of the iron-storage complex hemosiderin. Sometimes, the simpler term siderosis is used instead.

Other definitions distinguishing hemochromatosis or hemosiderosis that are occasionally used include:

- Hemosiderosis is hemochromatosis caused by excessive blood transfusions; that is, hemosiderosis is a form of secondary hemochromatosis.
- Hemosiderosis is hemosiderin deposition within cells, while hemochromatosis is hemosiderin within cells and the interstitium.
- Hemosiderosis is iron overload that does not cause tissue damage, while hemochromatosis does.
- Hemosiderosis is arbitrarily differentiated from hemochromatosis by the reversible nature of the iron accumulation in the reticuloendothelial system.

The causes of hemochromatosis broken down into two subcategories: primary cases (hereditary or genetically determined) and less frequent secondary cases (acquired during life).

People of Northern European descent, including Celtic (Irish, Scottish, Welsh, Cornish, Breton etc.), English, and Scandinavian origin have a particularly high incidence of hemochromatosis type 1, with about 1:8 people being carriers of the principal genetic variant, the C282Y mutation on the HFE gene, and 0.5% of the population having the condition.

==== Non-classical hereditary hemochromatosis ====
The overwhelming majority of hereditary hemochromatoses are caused by mutations of the HFE gene discovered in 1996, but since then others have been discovered and sometimes are grouped together as "non-classical hereditary hemochromatosis", "non-HFE related hereditary hemochromatosis", or "non-HFE hemochromatosis". They are hemochromatosis type 2 (2A and 2B), type 3, type 4, type 5, other genes related (such as BMP6, SUGP2 and DENND3) and digenic.

=== Other causes of primary iron overload (non-hemochromatosis) ===
- Aceruloplasminemia
- Congenital Atransferrinemia
- GRACILE syndrome

Description	OMIM	Mutation
Hemochromatosis type 1: "classical" hemochromatosis	235200	HFE
Hemochromatosis type 2A: juvenile hemochromatosis	602390	Haemojuvelin (HJV, also known as RGMc and HFE2)
Hemochromatosis type 2B: juvenile hemochromatosis	606464	hepcidin antimicrobial peptide (HAMP) or HFE2B
Hemochromatosis type 3	604250	transferrin receptor-2 (TFR2 or HFE3)
Hemochromatosis type 4	604653	ferroportin (SLC11A3/SLC40A1)
Hemochromatosis type 5	615517	FTH1
BMP6-related hemochromatosis	620121	BMP6
Neonatal hemochromatosis	231100	(unknown)
Acaeruloplasminaemia (very rare)	604290	caeruloplasmin
Congenital atransferrinaemia (very rare)	209300	transferrin
GRACILE syndrome (very rare)	603358	BCS1L

Most types of hereditary hemochromatosis have autosomal recessive inheritance, while type 4, type 5 and BMP6-related have autosomal dominant inheritance.

=== Secondary hemochromatosis ===
- Severe chronic hemolysis of any cause, including intravascular hemolysis and ineffective erythropoiesis (hemolysis within the bone marrow)
- Multiple frequent blood transfusions (either whole blood or just red blood cells), which are usually needed either by individuals with hereditary anaemias (such as beta-thalassaemia major, sickle cell anaemia, Diamond–Blackfan anaemia), or by older patients with severe acquired anaemias such as in myelodysplastic syndromes.
- Excess parenteral (non-ingested) iron supplements, such as what can acutely happen in iron poisoning
- Excess dietary iron (i.e. African iron overload)
- Some disorders do not normally cause hemochromatosis on their own, but may do so in the presence of other predisposing factors. These include cirrhosis (especially related to alcohol use disorder), alcoholic steatohepatitis, prolonged hemodialysis, and post-portacaval shunting

=== Other causes of iron overload ===
- GALD-NH (Gestacional alloimmune liver disease)
- Dysmetabolic Iron Overload Syndrome (DIOS)

It is a condition characterized by a mild to moderate accumulation of iron in the liver associated with metabolic disorders, particularly Metabolic dysfunction-associated steatotic liver disease (MASLD) and metabolic syndrome. Transferrin saturation is generally 20-45%; if this is above 60%, it is highly unlikely to be due to DIOS. It is not hemochromatosis.

== Pathophysiology ==
Defects in iron metabolism, specifically involving the iron regulatory protein hepcidin are thought to play an integral role in the pathogenesis of hereditary hemochromatosis.

Normally, hepcidin acts to reduce iron levels in the body by inhibiting intestinal iron absorption and inhibiting iron mobilization from stores in the bone marrow and liver. Iron is absorbed from the intestines (mostly in the duodenum) and transported across intestinal enterocytes or mobilized out of storage in liver hepatocytes or from macrophages in the bone marrow by the transmembrane ferroportin transporter. In response to elevated plasma iron levels, hepcidin inhibits the ferroportin transporter, leading to decreased iron mobilization from stores and decreased intestinal iron absorption, thus functioning as a negative iron regulatory protein.

In hereditary hemochromatosis, mutations in the proteins involved in hepcidin production including HFE (homeostatic iron regulator), hemojuvelin and transferrin receptor 2 lead to a loss or decrease in hepcidin production, which subsequently leads to the loss of the inhibitory signal regulating iron absorption and mobilization and thus leads to iron overload. In very rare instances, mutations in ferroportin result in ferroportin resistance to hepcidin's negative regulatory effects, and continued intestinal iron absorption and mobilization despite inhibitory signaling from hepcidin.

The resulting iron overload causes iron to deposit in various sites throughout the body, especially the liver and joints, which, coupled with oxidative stress, leads to organ damage or joint damage and the pathological findings seen in hemochromatosis.

== Diagnosis ==
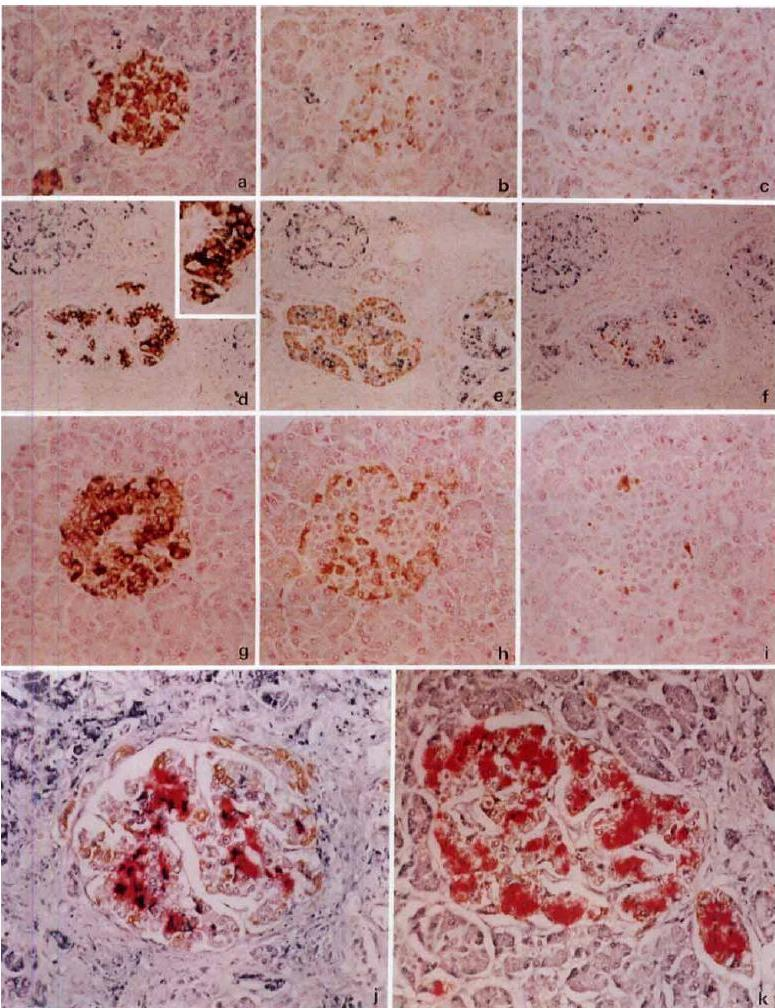
Selective iron deposition (blue) in pancreatic islet beta cells (red)

There are several methods available for diagnosing and monitoring iron overload. Current guidelines recommend quantitative liver MRI combined with HFE genotyping as a diagnostic approach; liver biopsy and calculation of the hepatic iron index are reserved for equivocal cases or for staging hepatic fibrosis.

=== Blood test ===
Blood tests are usually the initial test if there is a clinical suspicion of iron overload. Serum ferritin testing is a low-cost, readily available, and minimally invasive method for assessing body iron stores. However, ferritin levels may be elevated due to a variety of other causes, including obesity, infection, inflammation (as an acute phase protein), chronic alcohol intake, liver disease, kidney disease, and cancer. In males and postmenopausal females, normal range of serum ferritin is between 12 and 300 ng/mL (670 pmol/L) . In premenopausal females, normal range of serum ferritin is between 12 and 150 or 200 ng/mL (330 or 440 pmol/L). In those with hemochromatosis, the serum ferritin level correlates with the degree of iron overload. Ferritin levels are usually monitored serially in those with hemochromatosis to assess response to treatment.

Elevations in serum levels of the iron transporter protein transferrin saturation as well as increased red blood cell mean corpuscular volume and mean corpuscular hemoglobin concentration usually precede ferritin elevations in hemochromatosis. Transferrin saturation of greater than 45% combined with an elevated ferritin level is highly sensitive in diagnosing HFE hemochromatosis. Total iron binding capacity may be low in hemochromatosis, but can also be normal. There are cases of iron overload with normal transferrin saturation.

=== Genetics ===
General screening for hemochromatosis is not recommended; however, first-degree relatives of those affected should be screened.

Once iron overload has been established, HFE gene mutation genetic testing for hereditary causes of iron overload is indicated. The presence of HFE gene mutations in addition to iron overload confirms the clinical diagnosis of hereditary hemochromatosis type 1. The alleles evaluated by HFE gene analysis are mutated (C282Y/C282Y; C282Y/H63D; C282Y/S65C; H63D/H63D) in 80-90% of patients with hereditary hemochromatosis; a negative report for these mutations of HFE gene does not rule out hemochromatosis.

=== Biopsy ===
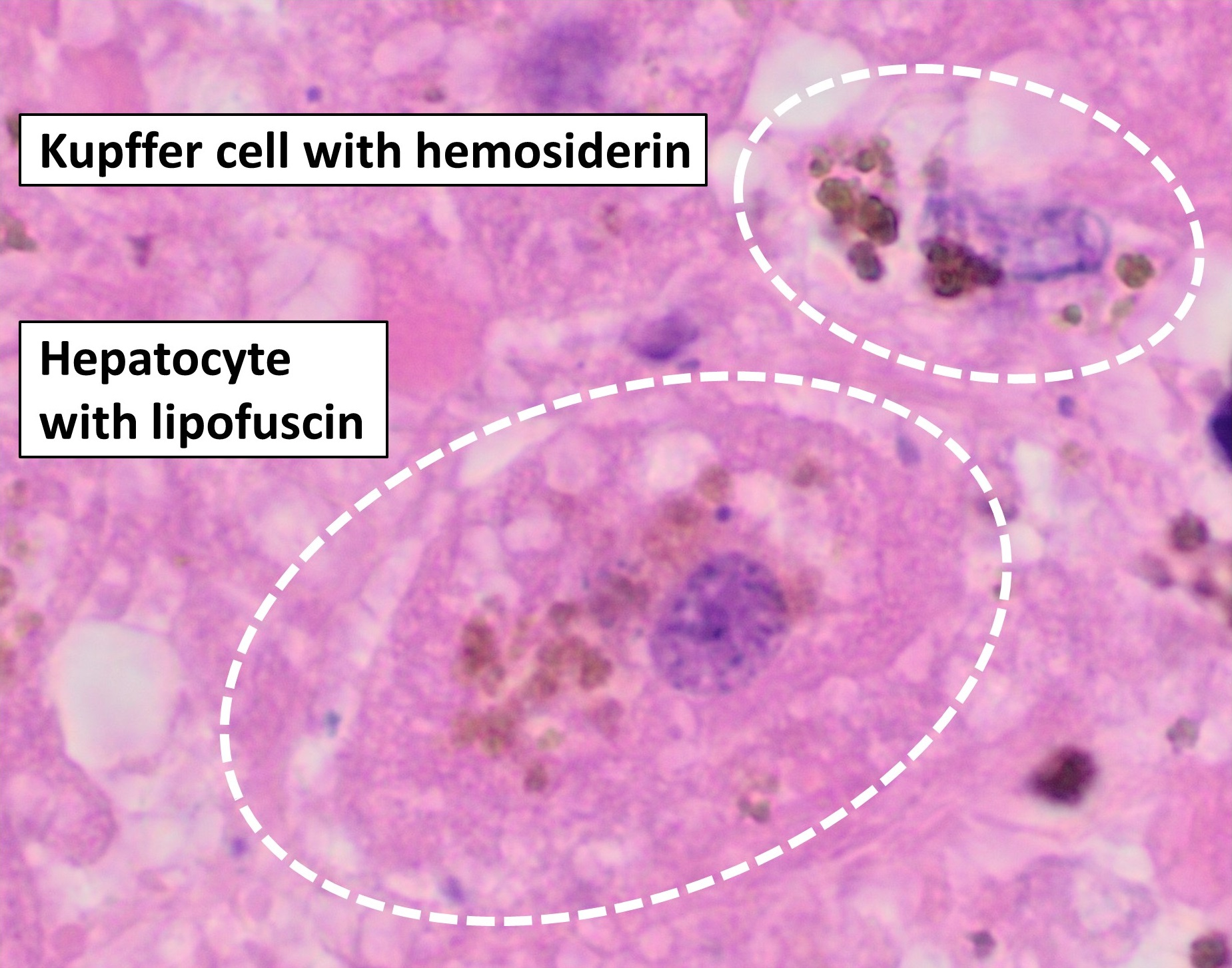
Histopathology of the liver, showing Kupffer cells with significant hemosiderin deposition (shown next to a hepatocyte with lipofuscin pigment, which is a common normal finding). H&E stain.

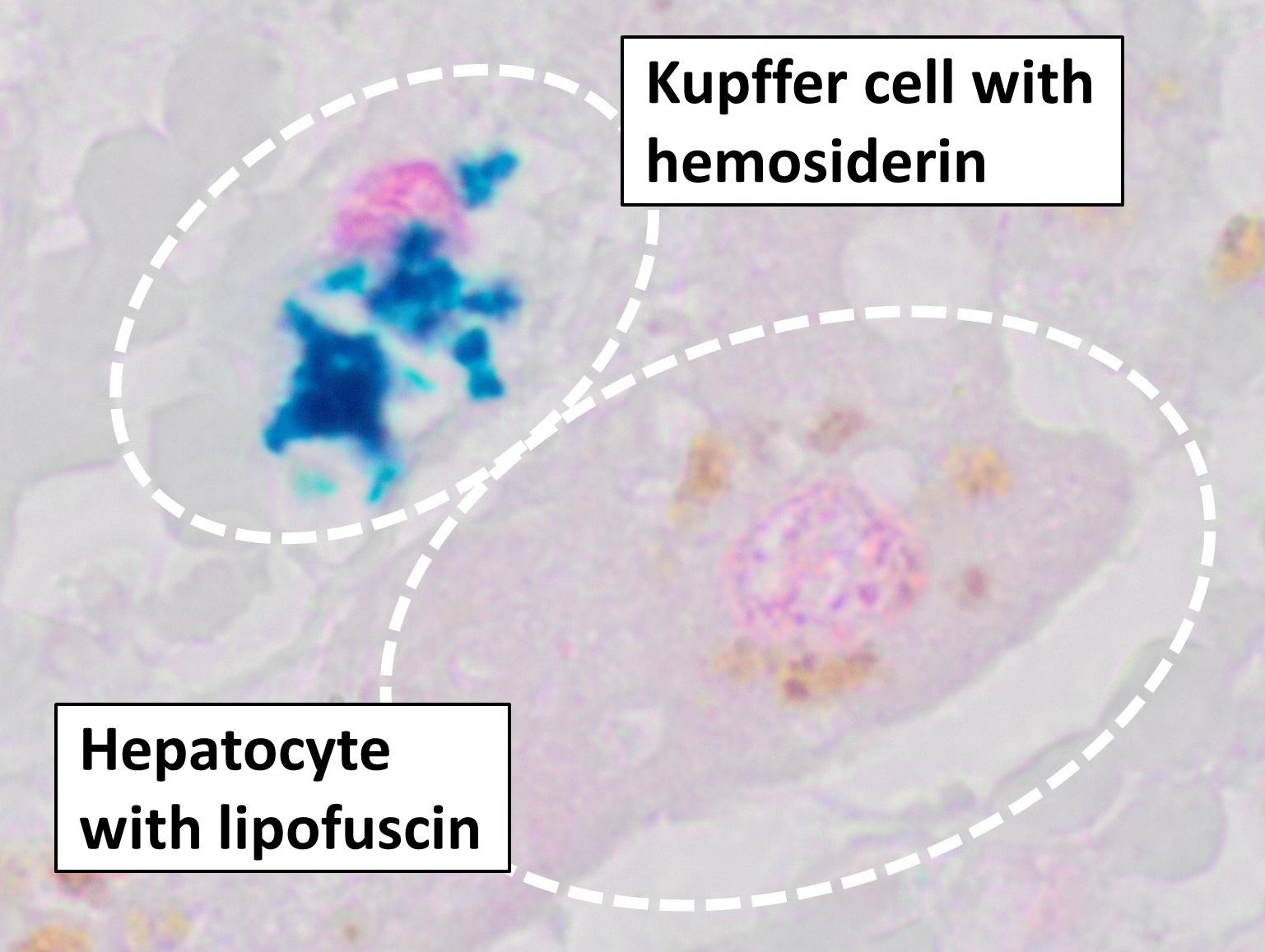
Prussian blue iron staining, highlighting the hemosiderin pigment as blue. This finding indicates mesenchymal iron overload (within Kupffer cells and/or portal macrophages) rather than parenchymal iron overload (within hepatocytes).

The gold standard for confirming iron overload is the liver biopsy. Liver biopsy is the removal of a small sample in order to be studied and can determine the cause of inflammation or cirrhosis. In someone with negative HFE gene testing, elevated iron status for no other obvious reason, and a family history of liver disease, additional evaluation of liver iron concentration is indicated. In this case, diagnosis of hemochromatosis is based on biochemical analysis and histologic examination of a liver biopsy.

=== Imaging ===
Magnetic resonance imaging (MRI) is used as a noninvasive method to estimate iron deposition levels in the liver and heart, which may aid in determining a response to treatment or prognosis. A T2*-weighted gradient-echo MRI sequence (often called T2* relaxometry) is used for the quantification of liver iron, but it does not detect some cases of mild iron overload. Liver elastography has limited utility in detecting mild liver fibrosis.

== Treatment ==
=== Phlebotomy ===
Phlebotomy, bloodletting or venesection is the mainstay of treatment in iron overload, consisting of regularly scheduled blood draws to remove red blood cells (and iron) from the body. Upon initial diagnosis of iron overload, the phlebotomies may be performed weekly or twice weekly, until iron levels are normalized. Once the serum ferritin and transferrin saturation are within the normal range, maintenance phlebotomies may be needed in some (depending upon the rate of reabsorption of iron), scheduled at varying frequencies to keep iron stores within the normal range. A phlebotomy session typically draws between 450 and 500 mL of blood. Routine phlebotomy may reverse liver fibrosis and alleviate some symptoms of hemochromatosis, but chronic arthritis is usually not responsive to treatment. In those with hemochromatosis; the blood drawn during phlebotomy is safe to be donated.

Phlebotomy is associated with improved survival if it is initiated before the onset of cirrhosis or diabetes.

=== Diet ===
The human diet contains iron in two forms: heme iron and non-heme iron. Heme iron is usually found in red meat, whereas non-heme iron is found in plant-based sources. Heme iron is the most easily absorbed form of iron. In those with hemochromatosis undergoing phlebotomy for treatment, restriction of dietary iron is not required. However, those who do restrict dietary iron usually require less phlebotomy (about 0.5–1.5 liters of blood less per year). Vitamin C and iron supplementation should be avoided as vitamin C accelerates intestinal absorption of iron and mobilization of body iron stores. Raw seafood should be avoided because of increased risk of infections from iron-loving pathogens (called siderophilic) such as Vibrio vulnificus. Alcohol consumption should be avoided due to the risk of compounded liver damage with iron overload.

=== Medication ===
Medications are used for those unable to tolerate routine blood draws, there are chelating agents available for use. The drug deferoxamine binds with iron in the bloodstream and enhances its elimination in urine and faeces. Typical treatment for chronic iron overload requires subcutaneous injection over a period of 8–12 hours daily. Two newer iron-chelating drugs that are licensed for use in patients receiving regular blood transfusions to treat thalassaemia (and, thus, who develop iron overload as a result) are deferasirox and deferiprone.

=== Chelating polymers ===
A minimally invasive approach to hereditary hemochromatosis treatment is the maintenance therapy with polymeric chelators. These polymers or particles have a negligible or null systemic biological availability and they are designed to form stable complexes with Fe^{2+} and Fe^{3+} in the GIT and thus limiting their uptake and long-term accumulation. Although this method has only a limited efficacy, unlike small-molecular chelators, the approach has virtually no side effects in sub-chronic studies. Interestingly, the simultaneous chelation of Fe^{2+} and Fe^{3+} increases the treatment efficacy.

== Prognosis ==
In general, provided there has been no liver damage, patients should expect a normal life expectancy if adequately treated by venesection. If the serum ferritin is greater than 1,000 μg/L at diagnosis, there is a risk of liver damage and cirrhosis, which may eventually shorten their life. The presence of cirrhosis increases the risk of hepatocellular carcinoma. Other risk factors for liver damage in hemochromatosis include alcohol use, diabetes, liver iron levels greater than 2,000 μmol/gram, and increased aspartate transaminase levels.

The risk of death and liver fibrosis is elevated in males with HFE type hemochromatosis but not in females; this is thought to be due to a protective effect of menstruation and pregnancy seen in females, as well as possible hormone-related differences in iron absorption.

== Epidemiology ==
HH type 1 is most common in certain European populations (such as those of Irish or Scandinavian descent) and occurs in 0.6% of that population. Men have a 24-fold increased rate of iron-overload disease compared with women.

=== Stone Age ===
Diet and the environment are thought to have had a large influence on the mutation of genes related to iron overload. Starting during the Mesolithic era, communities of people lived in an environment that was fairly sunny, warm, and had the dry climates of the Middle East. Most humans who lived at that time were foragers, and their diets consisted largely of wild plants, fish, and game. Archaeologists studying dental plaque have found evidence of tubers, nuts, plantains, grasses, and other foods rich in iron. Over many generations, the human body became well-adapted to a high level of iron content in the diet.

=== Neolithic ===
In the Neolithic era, significant changes are thought to have occurred in both the environment and diet. Some communities of foragers migrated north, leading to changes in lifestyle and environment, with a decrease in temperatures and a change in the landscape that the foragers then needed to adapt to. As people began to develop and advance their tools, they learned new ways of producing food, and farming also slowly developed. These changes would have led to serious stress on the body and a decrease in the consumption of iron-rich foods. This transition is a key factor in the mutation of genes, especially those that regulate dietary iron absorption. 70% of the body's iron is found in the red blood cells, and it is a critical micronutrient for effective thermoregulation in the body. Iron deficiency will lead to a drop in the core temperature. In the chilly and damp environments of Northern Europe, supplementary iron from food was necessary to keep temperatures regulated; however, without sufficient iron intake, the human body would have started to store iron at higher rates than normal. In theory, the pressures caused by migrating north would have selected for a gene mutation that promoted greater absorption and storage of iron.

=== Viking hypothesis ===
Studies and surveys conducted to determine the frequencies of hemochromatosis help explain how the mutation migrated around the globe. In theory, the disease initially evolved from travelers migrating from the north. Surveys show a particular distribution pattern with large clusters and frequencies of gene mutations along the western European coastline. This led the development of the "Viking Hypothesis". Cluster locations and mapped patterns of this mutation correlate closely to the locations of Viking settlements in Europe established c.700 AD to c.1100 AD. The Vikings originally came from Norway, Sweden, and Denmark. Viking ships made their way along the coastline of Europe in search of trade, riches, and land. Genetic studies suggest that the extremely high frequency patterns in some European countries are the result of migrations of Vikings and later Normans, indicating a genetic link between hereditary hemochromatosis and Viking ancestry.

=== Modern times ===
In 1865, Armand Trousseau (a French internist) was one of the first to describe many of the symptoms of a diabetic patient with cirrhosis of the liver and bronzed skin color. The term hemochromatosis was first used by German pathologist Friedrich Daniel von Recklinghausen in 1889 when he described an accumulation of iron in body tissues.

== Identification of genetic factors ==
Although it was known most of the 20th century that most cases of hemochromatosis were inherited, they were incorrectly assumed to depend on a single gene.

In 1935, J.H. Sheldon, a British physician, described the link to iron metabolism for the first time, as well as demonstrating its hereditary nature.

In 1996, Feder and colleagues identified the hemochromatosis gene, HFE gene. Felder found that the HFE gene has two main mutations, causing amino acid substitutions C282Y and H63D, which were the main cause of hereditary hemochromatosis. The next year the CDC and the National Human Genome Research Institute sponsored an examination of hemochromatosis following the discovery of the HFE gene, which helped lead to the population screenings and estimates that are still being used today.

== See also ==
- Human iron metabolism
- Iron deficiency
