= Nancy Olivieri =

Toronto haematologist and researcher

Nancy Fern Olivieri
- Born: 1954 (age 71–72); Hamilton, Ontario
- Education: University of Toronto McMaster University Harvard University
- Awards: AAAS Award for Scientific Freedom and Responsibility (2009), John Maddox Prize (2023)
- Scientific career
- Fields: Hematology
- Workplaces: University of Toronto

Nancy Fern Olivieri (born 1954) is a prominent Toronto haematologist and researcher with an interest in the treatment of haemoglobinopathies. She is best known for a protracted struggle with the Hospital for Sick Children and the pharmaceutical company Apotex about the drug deferiprone.

== Early life ==
Olivieri was born to the Hamilton, Ontario, Doctor Fernando Olivieri and Victoria Olivieri. Her paternal grandfather had immigrated to Hamilton from Italy in 1909. Olivieri received a Bachelor of Science from the University of Toronto and an MD from McMaster University in 1978. She has also pursued training in Internal Medicine and Hematology at McMaster, University of Toronto, and Harvard University.

== Deferiprone controversy ==
Starting in 1989, Olivieri was part of a group evaluating the use of a drug, deferiprone, in treating persons with the blood disorder thalassaemia. Starting from 1985, this work included a clinical trial partly funded by Apotex. During the course of the trial, Olivieri became concerned about evidence that pointed to the drug being inefficacious for some patients. Olivieri informed both the research ethics board that was monitoring the study and Apotex, the drug maker. The research ethics board instructed Olivieri to inform participants about her concerns. Apotex responded by noting that Olivieri had signed a confidentiality agreement as part of the drug trial and that informing participants about her concerns, the validity of which Apotex disputed, would violate that confidentiality agreement. In 1996, Apotex threatened to vigorously pursue legal remedies against her if she disclosed her conclusions to patients. Olivieri disclosed her concerns to her patients, and Apotex ended the portion of the study in which she was participating. In 1998, the New England Journal of Medicine published a paper by Olivieri and seven other authors, with further study results suggesting that deferiprone led to progressive hepatic fibrosis.

Olivieri's scientific findings, which sparked the controversy, have been challenged on the basis of data from clinical trials conducted by Apotex.

Deferiprone is approved for use in over 50 countries, but not in Canada. It was approved in the US in 2011 under the FDA's accelerated approval program.

An investigation commissioned by the Canadian Association of University Teachers (CAUT) revealed that one of Olivieri's critics, Gideon Koren, had anonymously sent disparaging letters about Olivieri to the media and colleagues. Koren initially denied responsibility, but substantial DNA evidence tied him to the letters, and he was reprimanded.

Olivieri has advocated greater academic freedom and called for less control of research by pharmaceutical companies. This situation was publicised extensively and was investigated by the Canadian Association of University Teachers.

== Awards and honours ==
Olivieri was awarded the 2009 AAAS Award for Scientific Freedom and Responsibility for her "indefatigable determination that patient safety and research integrity come before institutional and commercial interests and for her courage in defending these principles in the face of severe consequences."

Olivieri is the 2023 recipient of the John Maddox Prize in recognition of her “determination to act with integrity…in the face of extreme pressure from the company producing it, ultimately at great personal cost” in the Deferiprone controversy. The Maddox Prize is awarded by the UK-based Sense about Science charity in partnership with Nature (journal).

== See also ==
- List of whistleblowers
