= SUGP2 =

Protein-coding gene in the species Homo sapiens

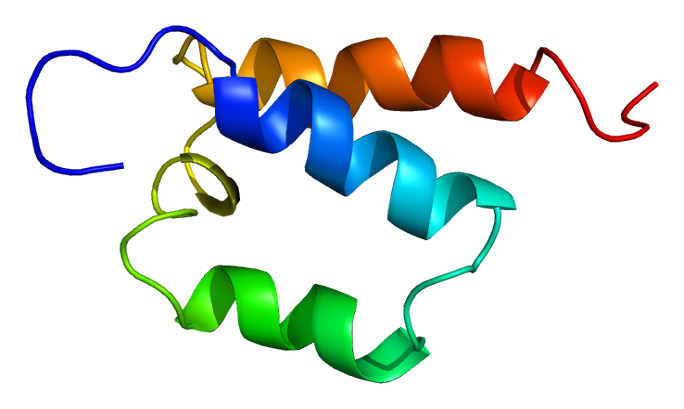

Identifiers
- Aliases: SUGP2, SFRS14, SURP and G-patch domain containing 2, SRFS14
- External IDs: OMIM: 607993; MGI: 2678085; GeneCards: SUGP2
Available structures
PDB	Ortholog search: PDBe RCSB
PDB	List of PDB id codes 1X4P

Gene location (Human)
Chr.	Chromosome 19 (human)
Band	19p13.11	Start	18,990,888 bp
Band	19p13.11	End	19,034,023 bp

Gene location (Mouse)
Chr.	Chromosome 8 (mouse)
Band	8|8 B3.3	Start	70,234,226 bp
Band	8|8 B3.3	End	70,279,915 bp
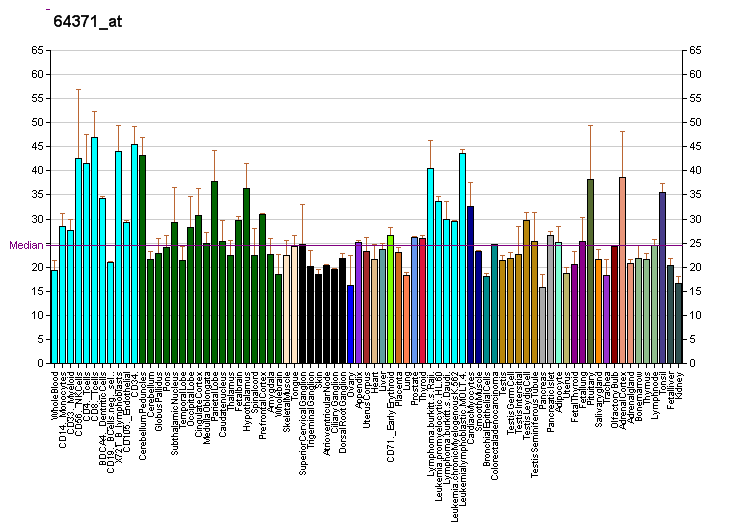

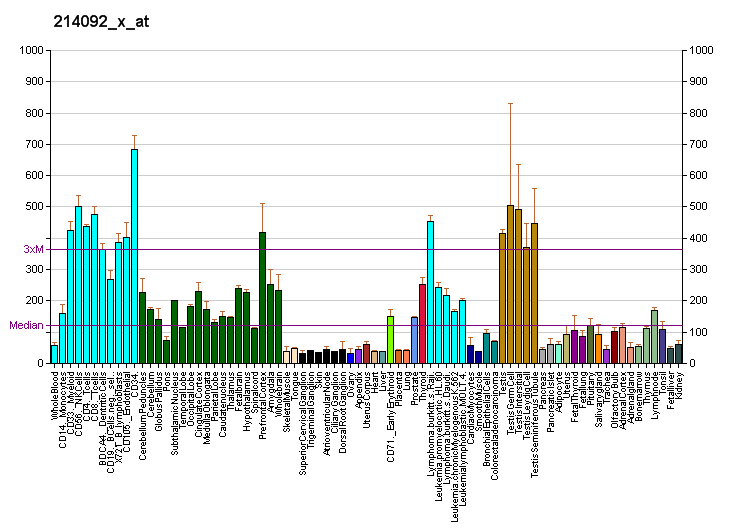

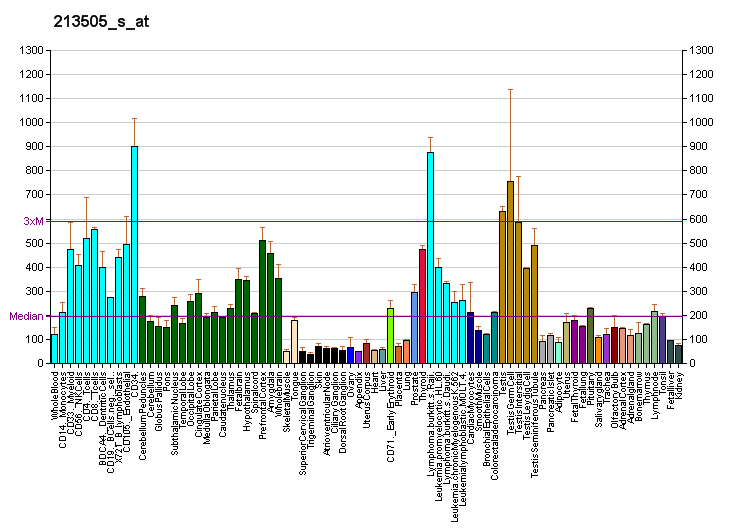
RNA expression pattern
Bgee	Human / Mouse (ortholog); Top expressed in: left testis; cerebellar hemisphere; right testis; right hemisphere of cerebellum; primary visual cortex; middle temporal gyrus; anterior pituitary; ventricular zone; right frontal lobe; left lobe of thyroid gland / Top expressed in: spermatocyte; spermatid; seminiferous tubule; neural layer of retina; barrel cortex; superior cervical ganglion; Rostral migratory stream; external carotid artery; anterior amygdaloid area; ventromedial nucleus; More reference expression data
BioGPS	More reference expression data
Gene ontology
Molecular function	nucleic acid binding; RNA binding
Cellular component	nucleus; nucleoplasm; nuclear body
Biological process	mRNA processing; RNA processing; RNA splicing
Sources:Amigo / QuickGO
Orthologs
Databases	NCBI: entry; OMA: entry
Species	Human	Mouse
Entrez	10147	234373
Ensembl	ENSG00000064607	ENSMUSG00000036054
UniProt	Q8IX01	Q8CH09
RefSeq (mRNA)	NM_001017392; NM_014884; NM_001321697; NM_001321698; NM_001321699 NM_001352071	NM_001168290; NM_172755
RefSeq (protein)	NP_001017392; NP_001308626; NP_001308627; NP_001308628; NP_055699 NP_001339000	NP_001161762; NP_766343
Location (UCSC)	Chr 19: 18.99 – 19.03 Mb	Chr 8: 70.23 – 70.28 Mb
PubMed search
- Wikidata
View/Edit Human	View/Edit Mouse

SURP and G-patch domain-containing protein 2 is a protein that in humans is encoded by the SUGP2 gene (previously SFRS14). Mutation of this gene may cause non-HFE-related hereditary haemochromatosis.
