= Neonatal hemochromatosis =

Neonatal Hemochromatosis is a rare, severe, and non-hereditary disease. It is a secondary iron overload with extrahepatic siderosis caused by severe fetal liver injury. This disease is not a type of hereditary hemochromatosis.

== Causes ==
Almost all cases of neonatal hemochromatosis (NH) are caused by Gestational Alloimmune Liver Disease (GALD). In GALD, the mother becomes sensitized to a fetal hepatic antigen; the resulting IgG antibodies cross the placenta, activate complement, and destroy fetal hepatocytes, triggering the iron-overload phenotype that defines NH. The NH could be classified as a congenital alloimmune hepatitis. Its estimated prevalence in the world is <1 case per 1,000,000 live births. The risk of GALD-NH occurring in subsequent pregnancies is very high (80-95%), but prophylactic high-dose maternal intravenous immunoglobulin (IVIG) therapy reduces the recurrence rate to 5-10%. GALD has other forms of presentation besides NH.

=== Other causes of the NH phenotype ===
Although GALD-associated NH (GALD-NH) predominates, the "NH syndrome" pattern can also arise from other forms of fetal or perinatal liver injury (infections, metabolic disorders, bile acid synthesis defects, etc).

== Diagnosis ==
The diagnosis of NH is based on a stepwise approach combining clinical findings, laboratory tests, imaging studies and targeted biopsies.

- Clinical suspicion: Newborn with acute liver failure (jaundice, coagulopathy, ascites, edema, hypoglycemia). Prenatal history suggestive of NH (fetal hydrops, oligohydramnios, or intrauterine growth restriction).
- Laboratory studies: Elevated transaminases, low serum albumin, impaired coagulation (INR >3), elevated ferritin (typically >800 ng/ml), increased transferrin saturation, markedly elevated alpha-fetoprotein.
- Imaging studies: MRI detects hepatic iron overload and demonstrates extrahepatic overload and siderosis in the pancreas, myocardium, thyroid, and salivary glands. Abdominal ultrasound to exclude biliary obstruction.
- Biopsy: Minor salivary gland (there are hemosiderin deposits). Liver biopsy if MRI and salivary gland biopsy are nondiagnostic.
- Confirmation of NH: Positive extrahepatic siderosis on MRI or biopsy.

=== Differential diagnosis ===
The differential diagnosis of NH should include all causes of acute liver failure and secondary siderosis in the newborn as congenital infections, inborn errors of metabolism, hematologic and vascular disorders, cholestasis and biliary anomalies, hemorrhage, portal vein thrombosis, and perfusion disorders.

== Treatment ==
In 2004, effective treatment of the disease was limited to liver transplants.

- Current postnatal therapy

Any neonate with suspected GALD-NH should receive an initial dose of intravenous immunoglobulin G (IVIG) while diagnostic work-up is in progress. First-line definitive therapy combines a double-volume exchange transfusion (DVET) to clear maternal antibodies with high-dose IVIG to block complement-mediated hepatocyte injury. Improvement in coagulation (INR) may take 4-6 weeks as the liver regenerates.

- Liver transplantation

Despite DVET + IVIG, approximately 20% of infants still require liver transplantation when medical therapy fails or liver damage is irreversible.

- Antenatal prophylaxis

High-dose maternal IVIG weekly starting at 14-18 week's gestation and continue through delivery reduces recurrence of GALD-NH in subsequent pregnancies.
