= African iron overload =

Iron overload disorder caused by consumption of home-brewed beer

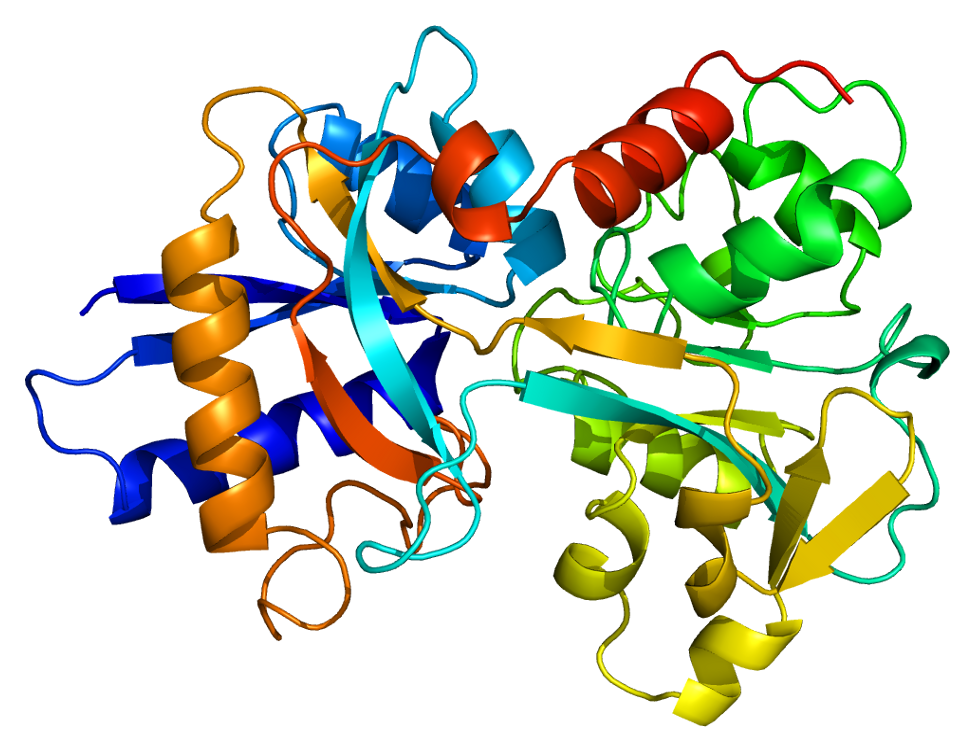
- Transferrin
- Specialty: Hematology

African iron overload is an iron overload disorder first observed among people of African descent in Southern Africa and Central Africa. It is now recognized to actually be two disorders with different causes, possibly compounding each other:

- Dietary iron overload is one contributor to iron overloads observed in African people. Home-brewed beer contains very high amounts of iron compared to commercial beer and causes overload. This form was prevalent in both the rural and urban Black African population. With the introduction of commercial beer in urban areas, the condition has decreased. However, the condition is still common in rural areas.
- Bantu siderosis, is the genetic side of the disorder. Some African people carry a unique ferroportin mutation that predisposes them to iron overload, making it a kind of ferroportin disease. African-Americans, who have no exposure to iron-rich beer, can also exhibit this issue.

This disorder can be treated with phlebotomy therapy or iron chelation therapy.

== Signs and symptoms ==
Symptoms can vary from one person to another. It depends on the extent of accumulation and on the body location of the accumulation. African iron overload can be considered in patient with some of these conditions.

- hepatomegaly
- mild to moderate liver dysfunction
- fibrosis
- portal hypertension
- ascites
- liver cirrhosis
- diabetes due to iron accumulation in pancreas
- osteoporosis
- cardiac abnormalities
- hepatocellular carcinoma

== Mechanism ==
Originally, this was blamed on ungalvanised barrels used to store home-made beer, which led to increased oxidation and increased iron levels in the beer. Further investigation has shown that only some people drinking this sort of beer get an iron overload syndrome, and that a similar syndrome occurred in people of African descent who have had no contact with this kind of beer (e.g., African Americans).

This led investigators to the discovery of a gene polymorphism in the gene for ferroportin, which predisposes some people of African descent to iron overload.

=== Diet ===
Preparing beer in iron pots or drums results in high iron content. The iron content in home-brewed beer is around 46–82 mg/L, compared to 0.5 mg/L in commercial beer.

=== Genetics ===
The SLC40A1 gene encodes for ferroportin. Ferroportin/SLC40A1 Q248H mutation in exon 6 occurs as a polymorphism in individuals of sub-Saharan African descent, but it was not identified in western Caucasians.

Q248H has not yet been conclusively found to be responsible for iron overload. It is found in a minority of African American and Native African with primary iron overload but was not found more regularly in Native southern Africans with dietary iron overload. It is also not associated with a statistically significant increase of risk in African Americans and Native Americans. In fact, studies have shown that SLC40A1 Q248H aggregate allele frequency is higher in Native Africans than the aggregate allele frequency in African Americans.

On the other hand, evidence suggests that Q248H may have an effect on iron supply. Ferroportin Q248H mutation in African families with dietary iron overload showed lower mean cell volume and higher ferritin concentration. Mice homozygous for the Q248H mutation show similar symptoms. They display only slight iron loading on a normal diet, but accumulates iron when fed a high-iron diet.

The probable cause of African iron overload is the combination of excess iron intake and functional changes in ferroportin. Penetrance of Q248H as a cause of iron overload is most likely low.

=== Hepatocellular carcinoma ===
Excess hepatic iron in dietary iron overload is typically associated with serum ferritin saturation of greater than 700pg/L and transferrin saturation of greater than 55%.

Increased hepatic iron generates chronic oxidative stress by disrupting the redox balance of the cell, which damages DNA, protein, hepatocytes and lipids. Increased lipid peroxidation is thought to be a vital contributor to hepatocellular carcinoma in iron overload. Oxidative stress leads to lipid peroxidation of unsaturated fatty acids in organelles and cell membrane.

== Diagnosis ==
Elevation in ferritin concentration without elevation in transferrin saturation does not rule out an iron overload disorder. This combination can be observed in loss-of-function ferroportin mutation and in aceruloplasminemia. Elevated level of ferritin concentration can be observed in acute or chronic inflammatory process without pathologic iron overload.

Measurement of iron status
Characteristic	Normal range	Unit
Ferritin-male	12–300	ng/mL
Ferritin-female	12–150	ng/mL
Transferrin saturation-male	10–50	%
Transferrin saturation-female	15–50	%

Ferritin level above 200 ng/mL (449 pmol/L) in women or 300 ng/mL (674 pmol/L) in men who have no signs of inflammatory disease need additional testing. Transferrin saturation above normal range in male and female also need additional testing.

Chemical evidence of tissue vitamin C deficiency and mild to moderate liver dysfunction are likely to be seen in individuals with African iron overload. Elevation in gamma-glutamyl transpeptidase can be used as a marker for abnormalities in liver function.

Measurement of iron-related features
Characteristic	Normal range	Unit
Vitamin C	0.2–2; 11–114	mg/dL μmol/L
Gamma-glutamyl transpeptidase in male	< 55.2; 0.92	U/L μkat/L
Gamma-glutamyl transpeptidase in female	< 37.8; 0.63	U/L μkat/L

The severity of iron overload can be determined and monitored using a combination of tests. Measurement of serum ferritin indicates for total body iron overload. Liver biopsy measures the iron concentration of liver. It provides the microscopic examination of the liver. Measurement of serum hepcidin levels may be useful in diagnostic for iron overload. MRI can detect the degree of magnetic disruption due to iron accumulation. MRI can measure iron accumulation within the heart, liver, and pituitary. Accumulation of iron in a single organ does not provide proper representation of the total body iron overload.

== Treatment ==
A person's hemoglobin is important in the physician's consideration of iron reduction therapy. A physician can provide therapeutic phlebotomy if the patient's hemoglobin level is sufficient to sustain blood removal. The physician can also recommend the patient to routinely donate blood. When a patient's hemoglobin is not sufficient for phlebotomy. Iron reduction will likely require the removal of iron using specific drugs (iron-chelation). The physician may use a combination of these therapies in some situations.

== Prognosis ==
Individuals of sub-Saharan African descent with ferroportin Q248H are more likely to be diagnosed with African iron overload than individual without ferroportin mutation because individuals with ferroportin Q248H have elevated level of serum ferritin concentration.

== Recent research ==
Distinctive phenotypes of individuals with SLC40A1 Q248H are minor, if any. Serum ferritin concentration is likely to be high in persons with Q248H (mostly heterozygotes) than in wild-type SLC40A1. In xenopus oocytes and HEK 293 cells, the expression of wild type ferroportin was similar to the expression of ferroportin Q248H at the plasma membrane. In HEK 293 cells, Q248H was as predisposed to the activities of hepcidin-25 as wild type ferroportin. Ferroportin Q248H also unregulated the expression of transferrin receptor-1 in the same way as wild type. This indicates the ferroportin Q248H is associated with mild clinical phenotype or causes iron disorder in the presence of other factors.
