= Hemochromatosis type 4 =

Haemochromatosis type 4
- Other names: Ferroportin disease
- Specialty: Hepatology, Medical genetics
- Causes: Mutation in ferroportin gene
- Differential diagnosis: Hereditary hemochromatosis
- Treatment: Phlebotomy, Iron chelation
- Frequency: Rare

Hemochromatosis type 4 is a hereditary iron overload disorder that affects ferroportin, an iron transport protein needed to export iron from cells into circulation. Although the disease is rare, it is found throughout the world and affects people from various ethnic groups. While the majority of individuals with type 4 hemochromatosis have a relatively mild form of the disease, some affected individuals have a more severe form. As the disease progresses, iron may accumulate in the tissues of affected individuals over time, potentially resulting in organ damage.

== Signs and symptoms ==
Symptoms vary greatly between individuals with type 4 hemochromatosis. This difference in symptoms is likely due to the different types of SLC40A1 mutations patients may have. In general, signs and symptoms of type 4 hemochromatosis are caused by excess iron in cells, which leads to tissue damage. The damage is largely due to iron-catalyzed oxidative reactions. Iron can exchange electrons with a variety of substrates, which can lead to generation of reactive oxygen species. This can lead to oxidative stress, lipid peroxidation, and DNA damage, which may result in cell death. Two main forms of hemochromatosis type 4 exist (A and B), and the symptoms of these forms are distinct from one another.

Type 4A hemochromatosis typically has milder symptoms than other types of hemochromatosis. Individuals with type 4A hemochromatosis tend to have hyperferritinemia (elevated ferritin in the blood plasma) and low saturated transferrin levels. These individuals are likely to have liver and spleen iron overload, primarily in Kupffer cells and other macrophages. Because iron export is impaired, iron is unavailable for transport by circulating transferrin. This iron unavailability potentially leads to mild anemia in type 4A hemochromatosis patients because iron is necessary for hemoglobin synthesis, and red blood cells have a relatively high turnover rate. Over time, iron stores increase, and individuals with type 4A hemochromatosis may develop hepatic fibrosis.

The symptoms of type 4B hemochromatosis tend to be more severe. They resemble the symptoms of hemochromatosis types 1, 2, and 3. Plasma iron concentration is elevated, and symptoms include joint pain, diabetes, and arrhythmia. Liver iron deposition tends to be greater in type 4B than in type 4A. Liver damage occurs more frequently in this form of hemochromatosis than in type 4A, and some individuals develop cirrhosis of the liver.

== Genetics ==
Type 4 hemochromatosis is caused by mutations of the SLC40A1 gene, located on the long arm of chromosome 2, specifically at 2q32.2. The SLC40A1 gene encodes ferroportin, a protein responsible for exporting iron from cells in the intestine, liver, spleen, and kidney, as well as from reticuloendothelial macrophages and the placenta. More than 39 mutations to the SLC40A1 gene have been identified in patients with type 4 hemochromatosis. All reported SLC40A1 mutations are deletions or missense mutations, which lead to amino acid substitution.

Mutations to SLC40A1 that change the amino acid sequence can result in loss of function or gain of function for the resulting ferroportin protein. The loss of function mutation results in a phenotype that is different from that of a gain of function mutation, and these phenotypes are associated with two different forms of type 4 hemochromatosis. Loss-of-function mutations are more frequent and are associated with type 4A hemochromatosis. These mutations lead to a defect in the localization of ferroportin. Gain-of-function mutations are associated with type 4B and lead to production of ferroportin that resists negative regulation by hepcidin.

Unlike other forms of hemochromatosis, which have a recessive pattern of inheritance, type 4 is an autosomal dominant disorder. The dominant inheritance pattern occurs in hemochromatosis type 4 because ferroportin is multimeric. Consequently, mutant ferroportin can associate with wild-type ferroportin in multimers and interfere with the function of normal ferroportin proteins.

== Pathophysiology ==
In normal iron regulation, iron is absorbed in the intestine, and ferroportin transports iron from the cells of the intestinal lining into the bloodstream. Iron in the bloodstream is then bound by transferrin, which carries the iron to target cells. Iron is stored in cells and blood serum in a protein called ferritin. Reticuloendothelial macrophages, which can phagocytose red blood cells, are important in the iron recycling process. Ferroportin is upregulated in the reticuloendothelial macrophages after phagocytosis occurs so that iron from the degraded red blood cells can be released into the bloodstream and transported to other types of cells as needed. Hepcidin, a protein synthesized in the liver in response to iron or inflammation, is a regulator of ferroportin expression. When hepcidin binds ferroportin, ferroportin is phosphorylated, endocytosed, tagged with ubiquitin, and degraded. More than 39 mutations to the SLC40A1 gene have been identified in patients with type 4 hemochromatosis. The misregulation of ferroportin in type 4 hemochromatosis can involve a failure of ferroportin to be properly expressed at the cell membrane, or it can involve a failure of ferroportin to respond to negative regulation by hepcidin.

Hemochromatosis type 4A is characterized by impaired iron export in cells. Reticuloendothelial macrophages are most affected. Iron accumulates preferentially in Kupffer cells, which are located in the liver, and serum ferritin increases; less iron is available for circulating transferrin, a protein that binds iron and transports it through the bloodstream to cell receptors. This means that, while iron is trapped in certain types of tissues, it cannot be transported to tissues where it is needed. The accumulation of iron in tissues due to impaired iron export can lead to increasing transferrin iron saturation and liver parenchymal iron overload in advanced stages of the disease. More ferritin is produced to suppress oxidative cell damage, although the amount of ferritin that cells can accumulate is limited.

Hemochromatosis type 4B is characterized by abnormal iron release from macrophages and enterocytes because the mutant ferroportin is resistant to the hepcidin protein, which serves a regulatory function in wild-type ferroportin. Intestinal iron absorption and release of iron from macrophages is increased. Thus, this form of the disease leads to elevated transferrin saturation levels. Systemic iron overload results, and liver iron deposition is primarily in the hepatocytes.

== Diagnosis ==
Diagnosis is based upon identification of symptoms, medical history, family history, and laboratory tests. Blood tests may show high levels of ferritin and low, normal, or high levels of transferrin saturation, depending on the form of hemochromatosis. Ferroportin Disease (FD) is distinct in that it is typically inherited through an autosomal dominant pattern. The diagnosis must be confirmed by genetic testing for SLC40A1 mutations. Testing of SLC40A1 has been identified between Type 4A and 4B through missense mutations. The mutations, which are distinct from HH, differ by these mutations in either a gain or loss of function.(GOF / LOF) Type 4A is identified by the LOF of Ferroportin no longer allowing iron release from macrophages and enterocytes. Type 4B differs in identification because it is the GOF mutation that makes it no longer susceptible to degradation. The overall identification of the disease is marked by accumulation of iron in Kupffer cells. Abdominal MRI of the SSL triad (spleen, spine, liver) can help diagnose the patient and identify the associated form of the disease.

Complications with the diagnosis have occurred through clinical presentations and molecular findings. Genetic evidence alone isn't strong, researchers must use in vitro studies to prove if a specific mutation impairs iron export or leads to hepcidin resistance. Hyperferritinemia and increased hepatic iron concentration are noted classifications but studies are not consistent with reports to validate these findings. Common causes of these issues such as cancer, metabolic disorders, and inflammation should be considered before a diagnosis.

== Treatment ==
Treatment is based on the symptoms and severity of the disease. Iron chelators may be used to bind excess iron in tissues and allow for excretion of the excess metal. Individuals with hemochromatosis type 4B may be treated with therapeutic phlebotomy. However, individuals with hemochromatosis type 4A may not require treatment. Additionally, therapeutic phlebotomy may not be tolerated in individuals with type 4A because anemia may develop despite the elevated serum ferritin levels typically found in these individuals.

== Epidemiology ==
Ferroportin disease is rare.
