= Haemochromatosis type 3 =

- Other names: TFR2-related hemochromatosis
- Specialty: Hematology

Haemochromatosis type 3 is a type of iron overload disorder associated with deficiencies in transferrin receptor 2. It exhibits an autosomal recessive inheritance pattern. The first confirmed case was diagnosed in 1865 by French doctor Trousseau. Later in 1889, the German doctor von Recklinghausen indicated that the liver contains iron, and due to bleeding being considered to be the cause, he called the pigment "Haemochromatosis." In 1935, English doctor Sheldon's groundbreaking book titled, Haemochromatosis, reviewed 311 patient case reports and presented the idea that haemochromatosis was a congenital metabolic disorder. Hereditary haemochromatosis is a congenital disorder which affects the regulation of iron metabolism thus causing increased gut absorption of iron and a gradual build-up of pathologic iron deposits in the liver and other internal organs, joint capsules and the skin. The iron overload could potentially cause serious disease from the age of 40–50 years. In the final stages of the disease, the major symptoms include liver cirrhosis, diabetes and bronze-colored skin. There are four types of hereditary hemochromatosis which are classified depending on the age of onset and other factors such as genetic cause and mode of inheritance.

== Signs and symptoms ==
The presence of Haemochromatosis type 3 can be realized through its many signs and symptoms throughout bodily systems. Systems affected by Haemochromatosis type 3 include the skeletal, endocrine, cardiovascular, neurological, genitourinary, and integumentary systems. There are also implications associated with a person's hematology, laboratory analysis results, and their liver.

Those that inherit Haemochromatosis type 3 can be asymptomatic in up to 75% of cases. The most common symptoms for those with symptoms can include severe fatigue (75%), impotence (45%), arthralgia (44%), hepatomegaly (13%), skin pigmentation, and arthritis.

The specific diseases and conditions that show a correlation with Haemochromatosis type 3 are the following:

Systems Affected and Associated Symptoms
System	Symptom/Disease
Skeletal	Arthritis
Hematology	Anemia Lymphopenia Neutropenia Thrombocytopenic Purpura
Genitourinary (Male)	Impotence Decreased Libido Hypogonadism
Genitourinary (Female)	Amenorrhea
Endocrine	Diabetes
Neurologic	Fatigue
Abdomen, Liver	Cirrhosis Fibrosis
Cardiovascular	Cardiomyopathy
Integumentary	Hyperpigmentation
Laboratory Abnormalities	Increased Serum Ferritin Increased Serum Iron Increased Transferrin Saturation Increased Liver Transaminases

== Genetics ==
=== Inheritance Pattern ===
The disease haemochromatosis type 3 is inherited in an autosomal recessive manner. Individuals with this disease exhibit a mutation in either both copies of the TFR2 or as compound heterozygotes (two mutations with one mutation in TFR2 and one in HFE). People with only one copy of TFR2 that is mutated and no mutations in HFE are labeled as carriers. Carriers typically do not exhibit signs or symptoms of the disease. This disease is shown to have reduced penetrance. Thus, some people with pathogenic variants of the TFR2 gene may never present symptoms related to the disease.

=== Gene Involved ===
The gene involved with patients diagnosed with type 3 hemochromatosis is TFR2 ( or HFE3).

HFE (not the same as HFE3) is most often the cause of hereditary hemochromatosis. The HFE gene provides instructions for producing a protein that is located on the surface of cells, primarily liver and intestinal cells. The HFE protein is also found on some immune system cells. The HFE protein interacts with other proteins on the cell surface to detect the amount of iron in the body. When the HFE protein is attached to a protein called transferrin receptor 1, the receptor cannot bind to a protein called transferrin. When transferrin receptor 1 is bound to transferrin, iron enters liver cells. So, it is likely that the HFE protein regulates iron levels in liver cells by preventing transferrin from binding to transferrin receptor 1. The HFE protein regulates the production of a protein called hepcidin. Hepcidin is produced by the liver, and it determines how much iron is absorbed from the diet and released from storage sites in the body. When the HFE protein is not bound to transferrin receptor 1, it binds to a group of other proteins that includes hepcidin. The formation of this protein complex triggers the production of hepcidin. So when the HFE protein is bound to transferring receptor 1, hepcidin production is turned off and when the HFE protein is not bound to transferring receptor 1, hepcidin production is turned on.

The transferrin receptor 2 (TFR2) gene is responsible for encoding a single-pass type II membrane protein. This protein mediates cellular uptake of transferrin-bound iron, and may be involved in iron metabolism, hepatocyte function and erythrocyte differentiation.

=== Type of Mutations ===
Majority of the cases of hemochromatosis are caused by mutations in the HFE (Homeostatic Iron Regulator) gene. Type 3 HH is characterized by compound heterozygote mutations in both transferrin receptor 2 (TFR2) and HFE, i.e. a single mutation in each gene. HFE is located on chromosome 6 and TFR2 is located on chromosome 7. Multiple types of mutations have been found in TFR2 and associated with HH Type 3, including premature termination mutations, missense mutations, and nucleotide change mutations.

=== Location of the Genes ===
Heterozygous mutations in the transferrin receptor-2 gene (TFR2 on chromosome 7) and the mutation in the hemochromatosis type 3 gene (HFE3 on chromosome 6) are the causes of hemochromatosis type 3.

=== Spectrum of Disease Severity ===
The disease can manifest itself without showing any symptoms, but these symptoms can emerge over time and the disease can therefore become more severe. Symptoms that emerge early on in the disease are generally less severe, and may include conditions such as fatigue, weakness, skin discoloration, loss of sex drive and joint pain. Late in the disease, people may experience liver disease as well as disease to other major organs as excess iron is deposited over time. People can also develop diabetes, heart problems, and abdominal pain.

== Diagnosis ==
Like many genetic or rare diseases, diagnosis of haemochromatosis type 3 is challenging. In order to formulate a diagnosis healthcare professionals view medical history, symptoms, physical exam, and laboratory test results.

=== Testing Resources ===
The Genetic Testing Registry provides information about genetic tests for haemochromatosis type 3. There are 62 different clinical tests available including two biochemical Genetics tests and 60 molecular genetics tests. There is also one research test available.

- Clinical tests
  - Biochemical genetics tests (2)
    - Enzyme assay (2)
  - Molecular genetics tests (60)
    - Deletion/duplication analysis (22)
    - Sequence analysis of select exons (12)
    - Sequence analysis of the entire coding region (52)
    - Targeted variant analysis (9)
- Research Tests
  - TFR2-Related Hereditary Haemochromatosis (1)

== Management ==
Treatment for hemochromatosis type 3 may include reducing iron levels by removing blood (phlebotomy), iron chelation therapy, diet changes, and treatment for complications of the disease. The purpose of the treatment is to reduce the amount of iron in the body to normal levels, prevent or delay organ damage from excess iron, and maintain normal amounts of iron throughout the lifetime. Phlebotomy helps to remove excess iron from the body. Most treatment begins with weekly therapeutic phlebotomy, occasionally treatment is initially twice a week if iron levels are elevated. Maintenance phlebotomy usually involved treatment every 2–4 months. Iron chelation therapy may be recommended for people that have other health issues as well. Dietary recommendations may include avoiding alcohol and red meat. People with hemochromatosis are not recommended to take iron or vitamin C supplements.

== Epidemiology ==
The prevalence in the ethnic Norwegian population of homozygous and heterozygous inheritance is 0.8% and 12-15% respectively, which makes haemochromatosis one of the most common hereditary diseases in Norway. Type 1 hemochromatosis is one of the most common genetic disorders in the United States, affecting about 1 million people. It most often affects people of Northern European descent. The other types of hemochromatosis are considered rare and have been studied in only a small number of families worldwide.
