= Transfusion hemosiderosis =

Medical condition

- Specialty: Hematology
- Causes: Frequent blood transfusion
- Diagnostic method: Blood transferrin test, liver biopsy
- Differential diagnosis: Other causes of hemosiderosis
- Treatment: Phlebotomy, erythrocytapheresis
- Medication: Iron chelation therapy

Transfusional hemosiderosis is the accumulation of iron in the body due to frequent blood transfusions. Iron accumulates in the liver and heart, but also endocrine organs. Frequent blood transfusions may be given to many patients, such as those with thalassemia, sickle cell disease, leukemia, aplastic anemia, or myelodysplastic syndrome, among others. It is diagnosed with a blood transferrin test and a liver biopsy. It is treated with venipuncture, erythrocytapheresis, and iron chelation therapy.

== Signs and symptoms ==
Transfusional hemosiderosis can cause cardiac arrhythmia and cardiomyopathy.

== Causes ==
Transfusional hemosiderosis is a potential side effect of frequent blood transfusions. These may be given for a number of conditions, including:

- thalassemia.
- sickle cell disease.
- leukemia.
- aplastic anemia.
- myelodysplastic syndrome.

== Mechanism ==
Hemoglobin, the oxygen-carrying molecule in a red blood cell, contains iron. The body has limited ways to store and remove iron. When red blood cells (RBCs) die, they are consumed by macrophages. Transfused RBCs have shorter lifespans that native ones, so they die and are consumed more frequently by the macrophages, which causes the latter to die from excess iron which is then released into the blood. Therefore, with frequent blood transfusions, iron builds up in the body over time. This can enter the liver, heart, pancreas, and endocrine organs. Free iron increases the production of oxygen radicals (mostly hydroxyl radicals) that cause damage to cells (particularly their DNA).

== Diagnosis ==
Transfusional hemosiderosis can be inferred with a blood transferrin test. Blood ferritin may be increased with a number of other conditions, so is less reliable for diagnosis. A liver biopsy may be used, which is the most accurate diagnostic technique. The level of siderosis seen in a liver biopsy can be graded by severity.

== Treatment ==
Transfusional hemosiderosis is treated with a number of therapies. Venipuncture (phlebotomy) removes blood. Erythrocytapheresis filters red blood cells from the blood. Chelation therapy removes iron from the blood. This involves delivering iron chelating agents such as deferoxamine, deferiprone or deferasirox. If iron overload has caused damage to end-organs, this is generally irreversible and may require transplantation.

== Prognosis ==
Transfusion hemosiderosis can cause permanent damage to tissues that may lead to death. Tissue damage can remain even after chelation therapy. Outcomes are usually worse in patients who require blood transfusions compared to those who can have alternative therapies. Cardiomyopathy and cardiac arrhythmia are often a cause of death.

== Society ==
Ted DeVita died of transfusional iron overload from too many blood transfusions.

== See also ==
- Hemosiderosis
