= Bone morphogenetic protein 6 =

Protein-coding gene in the species Homo sapiens

BMP6
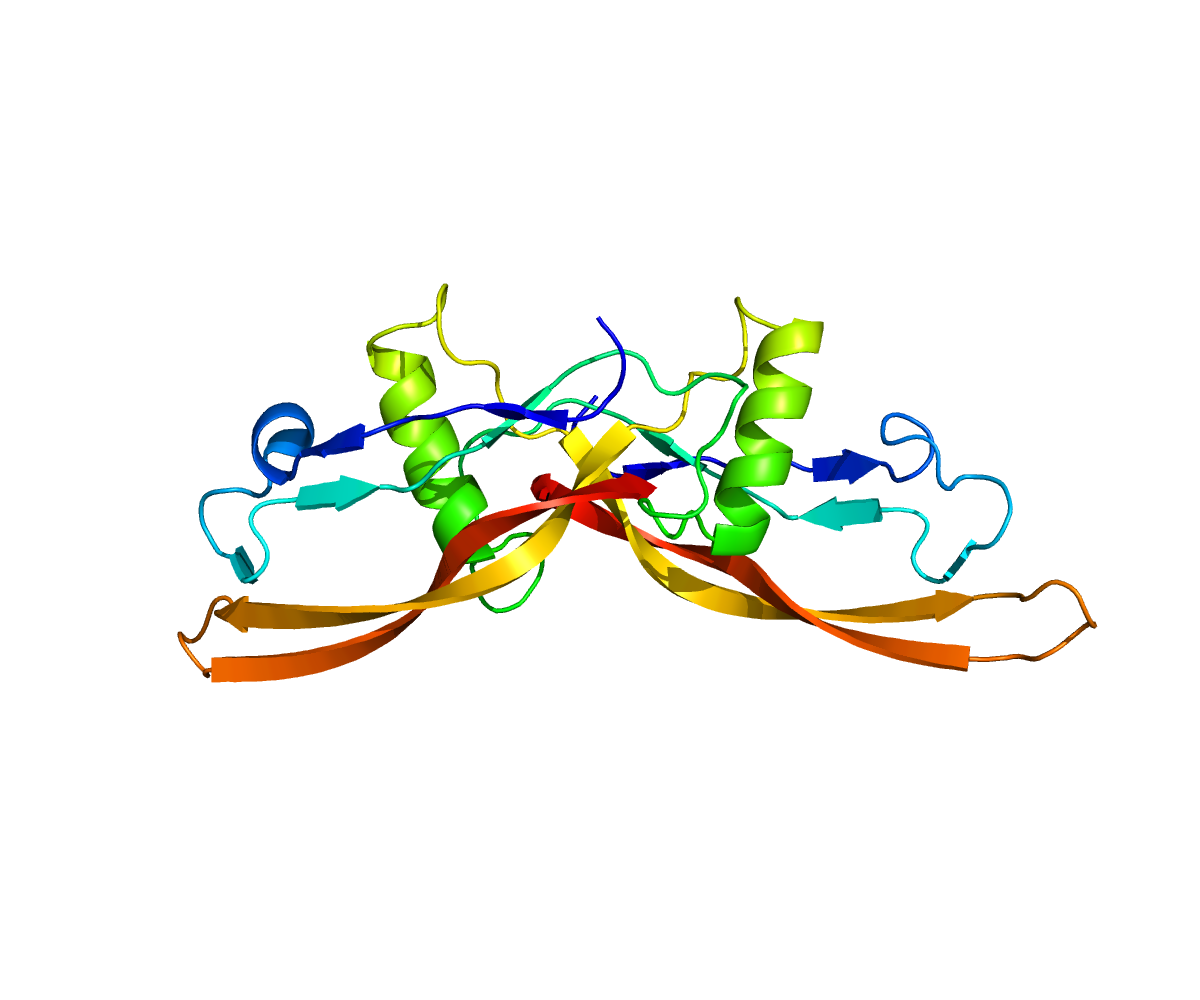

Identifiers
- Aliases: BMP6, VGR, VGR1, bone morphogenetic protein 6
- External IDs: OMIM: 112266; MGI: 88182; GeneCards: BMP6
Available structures
PDB	Ortholog search: PDBe RCSB
PDB	List of PDB id codes 2QCW, 2R52, 2R53

Gene location (Human)
Chr.	Chromosome 6 (human)
Band	6p24.3	Start	7,726,099 bp
Band	6p24.3	End	7,881,728 bp
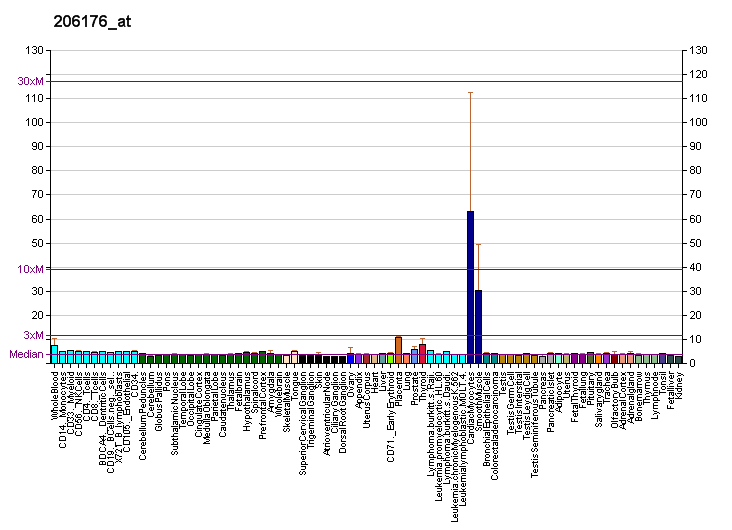
RNA expression pattern
Bgee	Human / Mouse (ortholog); Top expressed in: secondary oocyte; cartilage tissue; right lung; monocyte; periodontal fiber; subcutaneous adipose tissue; testicle; retinal pigment epithelium; tibia; right coronary artery / n/a; More reference expression data
BioGPS	More reference expression data
Gene ontology
Molecular function	cytokine activity; BMP receptor binding; protein heterodimerization activity; transforming growth factor beta receptor binding; growth factor activity
Cellular component	cytoplasm; extracellular region; extracellular space; vesicle
Biological process	eye development; regulation of apoptotic process; skeletal system development; cell differentiation; cellular response to iron ion; male genitalia development; positive regulation of aldosterone secretion; positive regulation of endothelial cell differentiation; regulation of MAPK cascade; positive regulation of endothelial cell proliferation; SMAD protein signal transduction; positive regulation of aldosterone biosynthetic process; response to retinoic acid; ossification; kidney development; positive regulation of bone mineralization; positive regulation of epithelial cell proliferation; positive regulation of pathway-restricted SMAD protein phosphorylation; cellular response to BMP stimulus; response to magnesium ion; response to glucocorticoid; negative regulation of transcription by RNA polymerase II; endochondral ossification; response to activity; BMP signaling pathway; response to iron ion; positive regulation of lipopolysaccharide-mediated signaling pathway; multicellular organismal iron ion homeostasis; multicellular organism development; cellular response to mechanical stimulus; cartilage development; positive regulation of osteoblast differentiation; positive regulation of chondrocyte differentiation; osteoblast differentiation; immune response; positive regulation of neuron differentiation; positive regulation of protein secretion; inflammatory response; type B pancreatic cell development; positive regulation of transcription by RNA polymerase II; positive regulation of SMAD protein signal transduction; cellular iron ion homeostasis; regulation of signaling receptor activity; positive regulation of cell population proliferation; cell development
Sources:Amigo / QuickGO
Orthologs
Databases	NCBI: entry; OMA: entry
Species	Human	Mouse
Entrez	654	12161
Ensembl	ENSG00000153162	n/a
UniProt	P22004	P20722
RefSeq (mRNA)	NM_001718	NM_007556
RefSeq (protein)	NP_001709	NP_031582
Location (UCSC)	Chr 6: 7.73 – 7.88 Mb	n/a
PubMed search
- Wikidata
View/Edit Human	View/Edit Mouse

Bone morphogenetic protein 6 is a protein that in humans is encoded by the BMP6 gene.

The protein encoded by this gene is a member of the TGFβ superfamily. Bone morphogenetic proteins are known for their ability to induce the growth of bone and cartilage. BMP6 is able to induce all osteogenic markers in mesenchymal stem cells.

The bone morphogenetic proteins (BMPs) are a family of secreted signaling molecules that can induce ectopic bone growth. BMPs are part of the transforming growth factor-beta (TGFB) superfamily. BMPs were originally identified by an ability of demineralized bone extract to induce endochondral osteogenesis in vivo in an extraskeletal site. Based on its expression early in embryogenesis, the BMP encoded by this gene has a proposed role in early development. In addition, the fact that this BMP is closely related to BMP5 and BMP7 has led to speculation of possible bone inductive activity. As of April 2009, an additional function of BMP6 has been identified as described in Nature Genetics April; 41 [4]:386-8. BMP6 is the key regulator of hepcidin, the small peptide secreted by the liver which is the major regulator of iron metabolism in mammals.
