= Siderosis =

Medical condition with excess iron in body tissue

- Other names: Pulmonary siderosis, welder's disease
- Iron
- Specialty: Respirology

Siderosis is the deposition of excess iron in body tissue. When used without qualification, it usually refers to an environmental disease of the lung, also known more specifically as pulmonary siderosis or Welder's disease, which is a form of pneumoconiosis.

Pulmonary siderosis was first described in 1936 from X-ray images of the lungs of arc welders.

The name siderosis comes from Ancient Greek word for iron, sídēr(os), and has an -osis suffix.

== Signs and symptoms ==
Pulmonary siderosis does not usually cause harmful scar tissue formation within the lungs, which is why it said to be non-fibrotic condition, unlike asbestosis for example, and has also been called "benign pneumoconiosis".

Mild to moderate scarring of the lungs has been found in unusual cases of pulmonary siderosis. These people have had persistent breathlessness, coughing and decreased lung function. However, people in occupations where they are exposed to iron (or rust) dust are usually also exposed to other forms of dust such as silica, which upon repeated inhalation is known to cause dangerous silicosis. Because of this, it is not known for certain whether the inhalation of pure iron or rust can cause detrimental scarring of the lungs that has been seen in some cases of pulmonary siderosis. Still, studies have shown lack of silica in tissue samples collected from people with pulmonary siderosis. This indicates that iron alone is enough to cause damage to the lungs.

Symptoms usually appear after a number of years, but may rarely appear within a year.

Eye exposure to iron dust can also cause another form of siderosis, "ocular siderosis" or "siderosis bulbi", which can cause eye discoloration, but also eye damage, like cataracts and night blindness. This happens via the corrosive effects of iron.

== Cause ==
Pulmonary siderosis is caused by repeated inhalation of fine iron or rust dust that happens usually over a number of years. This can happen during work consisting of welding, grinding, foundry work, paint manufacture or iron ore mining among other similar occupations where a person is exposed to fine iron dust or fumes.

== Diagnosis ==
Pulmonary siderosis causes changes within the lungs that are clearly visible in tissue samples, x-ray images and other radiological studies. In a tissue sample from alveoli patchy deposits of iron can be seen throughout the sample.

== Treatment ==
There is no cure for pulmonary siderosis or other interstitial lung diseases. Any damage is thus permanent. Symptoms can be treated.

== Prognosis ==
Outcome of pulmonary siderosis is often good if the inhalation of iron or rust dust is permanently avoided. However, welding has been associated with lung cancer, a condition which may have a poor outcome. Still, it is not known if pulmonary siderosis causes cancer in welders specifically or if these cases of cancer appear due to entirely different factors.

== See also ==
- Idiopathic pulmonary haemosiderosis – a disease caused by lung capillary bleeding
- Hemosiderosis – accumulation of hemosiderin in body
- Superficial siderosis – accumulation of hemosiderin in brain
- Iron deficiency – also known as sideropenia
- Iron overload – accumulation of iron in body from any cause
- African iron overload
