= Obligate carrier =

An obligate carrier is an individual who must carry a particular gene variant based on analysis of family history but who is clinically unaffected. The term usually applies to disorders inherited in an autosomal recessive and X-linked recessive manner.

== X-linked Recessive ==
=== Inheritance ===
In X-linked recessive disorders, only females can be unaffected carriers of the recessive mutation, making such females obligate carriers of this type of disorder. Females acquire one X-chromosome from their father and one from their mother, and this means they can either be heterozygous for the mutated allele or homozygous. If heterozygous, she is simply a carrier of the mutated allele because the disease is recessive. If homozygous, she has the disease. An affected father with an X-linked recessive trait will always pass the trait on to a daughter. Therefore, all daughters of an affected male are obligate carriers (or affected, if they inherit the mutation from their mother as well). On the other hand, a carrier mother has a 50% chance of passing her mutated X-chromosome to a daughter. This makes all daughters of carrier mothers possible carriers but not obligate carriers. Males cannot be obligate or possible carriers of X-linked recessive traits because they only have one X-chromosome, and so are always phenotypically affected when receiving the mutated X-chromosome from their mother.

Females that are heterozygous for X-linked recessive disorders are obligate carriers, but can never be phenotypically affected, because of X-inactivation. Heterozygous females have an X-chromosome from each parent; one with a mutated gene and one with a functional copy of the same gene. When the mutated chromosome is randomly inactivated in order to maintain the copy number, presence of the functional copy results in a normal phenotype. Males only have one copy of any gene on the X-chromosome, and because they do not undergo X-inactivation, they only have the mutated gene. As a result, these types of diseases most commonly phenotypically affect males and rarely females.

=== Hemophilia ===
Haemophilia is an X-linked recessive disorder that impairs the body's control over blood clotting. Haemophilia A and Haemophilia B arise from mutations in the genes for factor VIII and factor IX, respectively. Females with this disease are almost exclusively unaffected, obligate carriers. The mutations can be passed on to offspring by mothers and fathers, but the phenotype is only expressed in males that inherit the mutation. All daughters of a hemophiliac father are obligate carriers of the disease.

== Autosomal Recessive ==
In an autosomal recessive disease, if an individual is heterozygous for the mutant allele, they are a carrier because the disease is recessive. If homozygous, they have the disease. All offspring of an affected individual are either heterozygous or homozygous for the mutated allele. Consequently, all unaffected (heterozygous) offspring of an affected individual are obligate carriers of the disease because they will necessarily carry the mutated allele.

== Detection ==
Due to the predictable patterns of heritable disorders, techniques can be used to detect past, present, and future disease prevalence in individuals among a family. Specifically, pedigrees and laboratory methods are used to search for and predict obligate carriers for a specific disease such as hemophilia. After analysis of family history, one way to be completely sure that an individual is a carrier is through genetic tests, such as mutational analysis. This allows professionals to see if the specific mutation exists in the chromosome of the individual. In potential hemophiliacs, factor assays are used to measure the amount of blood clotting in an individual. However, some carriers might have completely normal clotting levels and so this method is not always useful. Genetic counselling informs patients that may have a family history of a certain disease about their risk of disease and potential risk in their children.
