= Siderophilic bacteria =

Bacteria requiring free iron

Siderophilic bacteria are bacteria that require or are facilitated by free iron. They may include Vibrio vulnificus, Listeria monocytogenes, Yersinia enterocolica, Salmonella enterica (serotype Typhimurium), Klebsiella pneumoniae and Escherichia coli. One possible symptom of haemochromatosis is susceptibility to infections from these species. Certain non-bacterial microorganisms such as Rhizopus arrhizus and Mucor may also be siderophilic.

== See also ==
- Iron-oxidizing bacteria
- Dissimilatory metal-reducing bacteria
