= Deferasirox =

Oral iron chelator

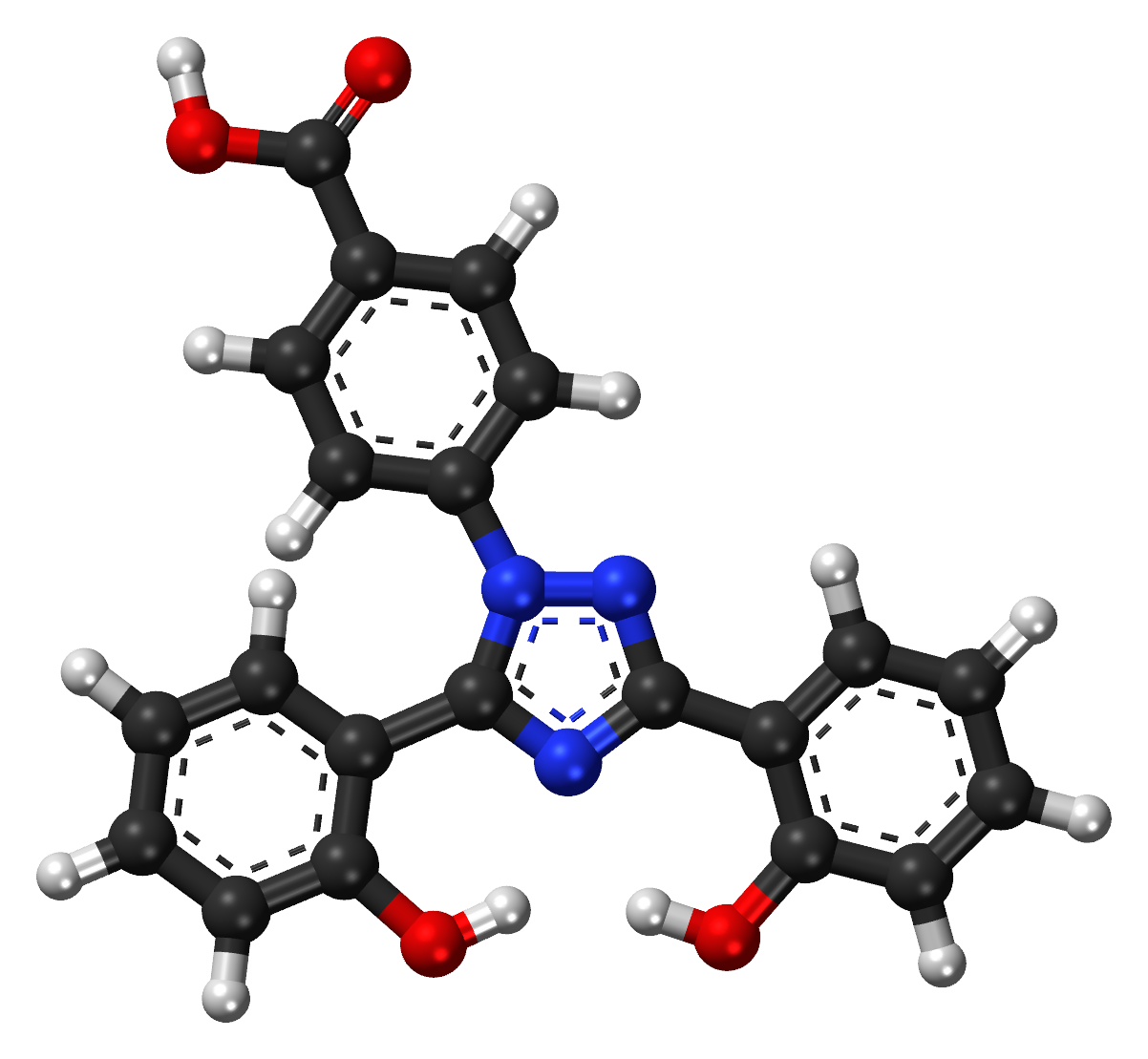

Clinical data
- Pronunciation: de FER a sir ox
- Trade names: Exjade, others
- Other names: CGP-72670, ICL-670A, IC L670
- AHFS/Drugs.com: Monograph
- MedlinePlus: a606002
- License data: US DailyMed: Deferasirox
- Pregnancy category: AU: C
- Routes of administration: By mouth
- ATC code: V03AC03 (WHO)

Legal status
- Legal status: AU: S4 (Prescription only); UK: POM (Prescription only); US: ℞-only; EU: Rx-only; In general: ℞ (Prescription only)

Pharmacokinetic data
- Bioavailability: 70%
- Protein binding: 99%
- Metabolism: Liver glucuronidation
- Elimination half-life: 8 to 16 hours
- Excretion: Fecal (84%) and kidney (8%)

Identifiers
- IUPAC name: 4-(3,5-Bis(2-hydroxyphenyl)-1H-1,2,4-triazol-1-yl)benzoic acid
- CAS Number: 201530-41-8
- PubChem CID: 214348
- DrugBank: DB01609
- ChemSpider: 4591431
- UNII: V8G4MOF2V9
- KEGG: D03669
- ChEBI: CHEBI:49005
- ChEMBL: ChEMBL550348
- CompTox Dashboard (EPA): DTXSID1048596
- ECHA InfoCard: 100.211.077

Chemical and physical data
- Formula: C_{21}H_{15}N_{3}O_{4}
- Molar mass: 373.368 g·mol^{−1}
- 3D model (JSmol): Interactive image
- Density: 1.4±0.1 g/cm^{3}
- SMILES: OC(=O)c1ccc(cc1)n2nc(nc2c3ccccc3O)c4ccccc4O
- InChI: InChI=1S/C21H15N3O4/c25-17-7-3-1-5-15(17)19-22-20(16-6-2-4-8-18(16)26)24(23-19)14-11-9-13(10-12-14)21(27)28/h1-12,25-26H,(H,27,28); Key:BOFQWVMAQOTZIW-UHFFFAOYSA-N

Deferasirox, sold under the brand name Exjade among others, is an oral iron chelator. Its main use is to reduce chronic iron overload in patients who are receiving long-term blood transfusions for conditions such as beta-thalassemia and other chronic anemias. It is the first oral medication approved in the United States for this purpose.

It was approved by the US Food and Drug Administration (FDA) in November 2005. According to the FDA (May 2007), kidney failure and cytopenias have been reported in patients receiving deferasirox tablets for oral suspension. It is approved in the European Union by the European Medicines Agency (EMA) for children six years and older for chronic iron overload from repeated blood transfusions. It is on the World Health Organization's List of Essential Medicines.

In July 2020, Teva decided to discontinue deferasirox. It is available as a generic medication.

== Properties ==
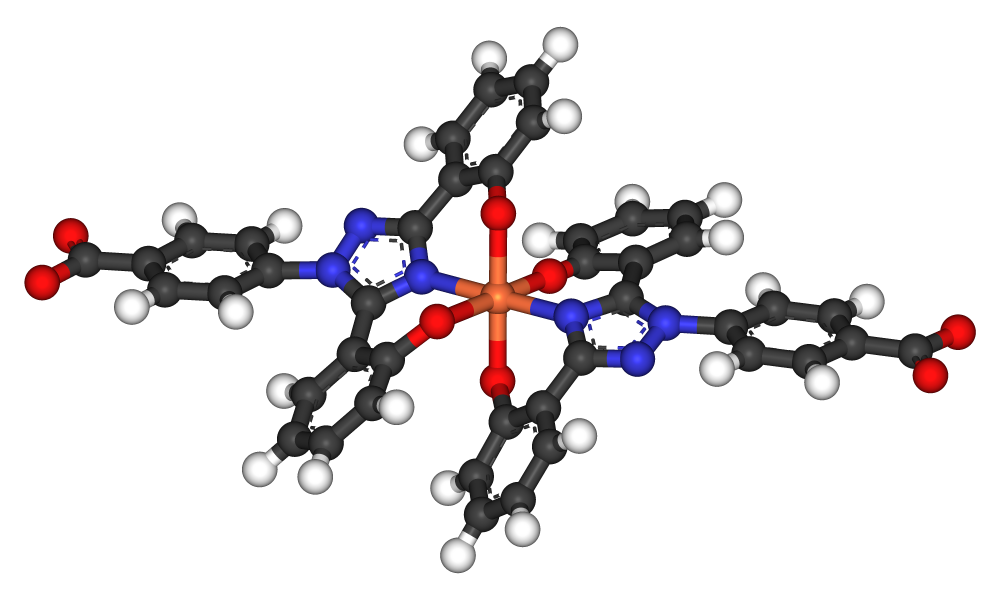
Two deferasirox molecules binding iron

The half-life of deferasirox is between 8 and 16 hours allowing once a day dosing. Two molecules of deferasirox are capable of binding to 1 atom of iron which are subsequently eliminated by fecal excretion. Its low molecular weight and high lipophilicity allows the drug to be taken orally unlike deferoxamine which has to be administered by IV route (intravenous infusion). Together with deferiprone, deferasirox seems to be capable of removing iron from cells (cardiac myocytes and hepatocytes) as well as removing iron from the blood.

== Synthesis ==
Deferasirox can be prepared from simple commercially available starting materials (salicylic acid, salicylamide and 4-hydrazinobenzoic acid) in the following two-step synthetic sequence:

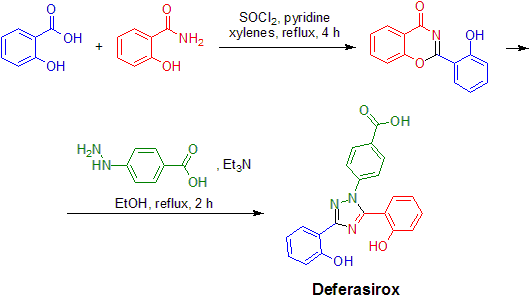
Image to be added

The condensation of salicyloyl chloride (formed in situ from salicylic acid and thionyl chloride) with salicylamide under dehydrating reaction conditions results in formation of 2-(2-hydroxyphenyl)-1,3(4H)-benzoxazin-4-one. This intermediate is isolated and reacted with 4-hydrazinobenzoic acid in the presence of base to give 4-(3,5-bis(2-hydroxyphenyl)-1,2,4-triazol-1-yl)benzoic acid (deferasirox).

== Risks ==
Deferasirox ranked second on the list of drugs most frequently suspected in reported patient deaths compiled for 2019, by the Institute for Safe Medical Practices, with 1320 suspected deaths. A boxed warning was added in the same year with regard to kidney failure, liver failure and gastrointestinal bleeding. It is suspected that the main driver of this spike in suspected deaths relates to the re-analysis of adverse event data by Novartis.
