= Atransferrinemia =

- Other names: familial atransferrinemia
- Atransferrinemia has an autosomal recessive pattern of inheritance, meaning both copies of the gene in each cell are defective.
- Symptoms: Anemia
- Causes: Mutations in the TF gene
- Diagnostic method: TF level, Physical exam
- Treatment: Oral iron therapy

Atransferrinemia is an autosomal recessive metabolic disorder in which there is an absence of transferrin, a plasma protein that transports iron through the blood. Atransferrinemia is characterized by anemia and hemosiderosis in the heart and liver. The iron damage to the heart can lead to heart failure. The anemia is typically microcytic and hypochromic (the red blood cells are abnormally small and pale). Atransferrinemia was first described in 1961 and is extremely rare, with only ten documented cases worldwide.

== Symptoms and signs ==
The presentation of this disorder entails anemia, arthritis, hepatic anomalies, and recurrent infections are clinical signs of the disease. Iron overload occurs mainly in the liver, heart, pancreas, thyroid, and kidney.

== Genetics ==
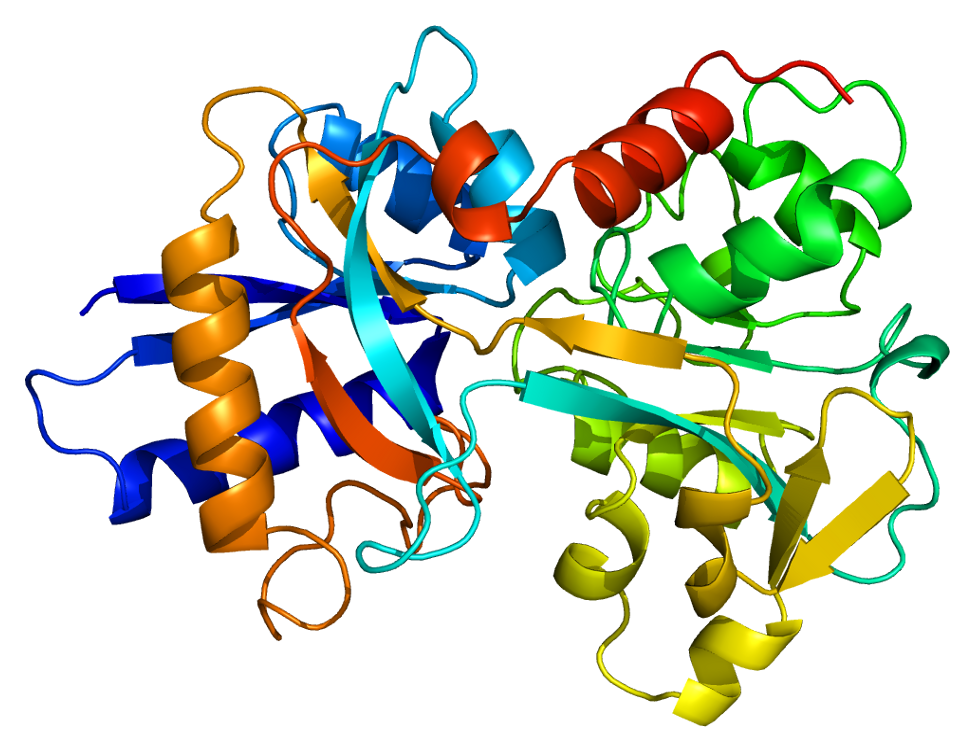
Protein TF (from TF gene)

In terms of genetics of atransferrinemia researchers have identified mutations in the TF gene as a probable cause of this genetic disorder in affected people.

Transferrin is a serum transport protein that transports iron to the reticuloendothelial system for utilization and erythropoiesis, since there is no transferrin in atransferrinemia, serum free iron cannot reach reticuloendothelial cells and there is microcytic anemia.

== Diagnosis ==
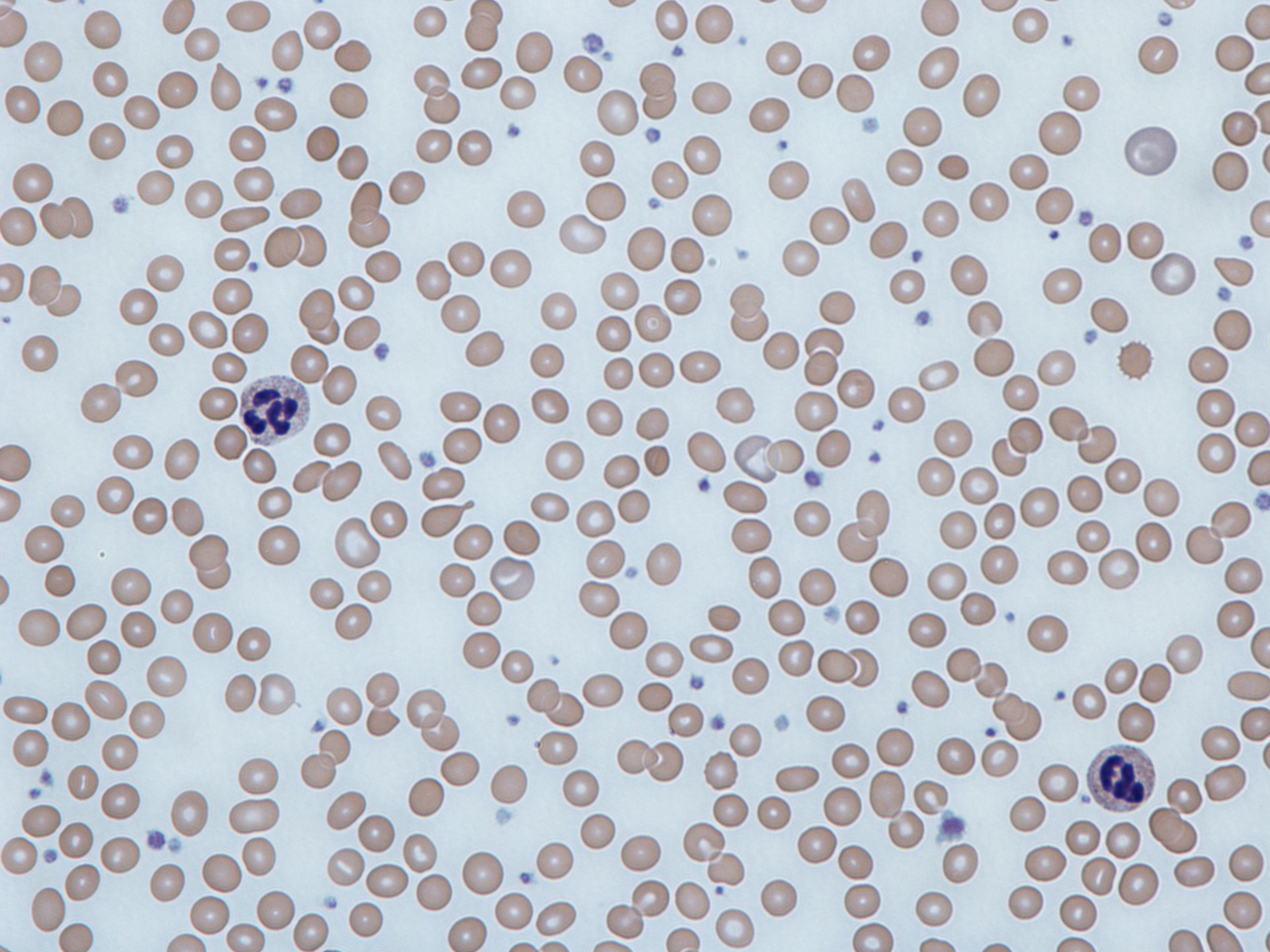
Anemia

The diagnosis of atransferrinemia is done via the following means to ascertain if an individual has the condition:

- Blood test (for anemia)
- TF level
- Physical exam
- Genetic test

=== Types ===
There are two forms of this condition that causes an absence of transferrin in the affected individual:

- Acquired atransferrinemia
- Congenital atransferrinemia

== Treatment ==
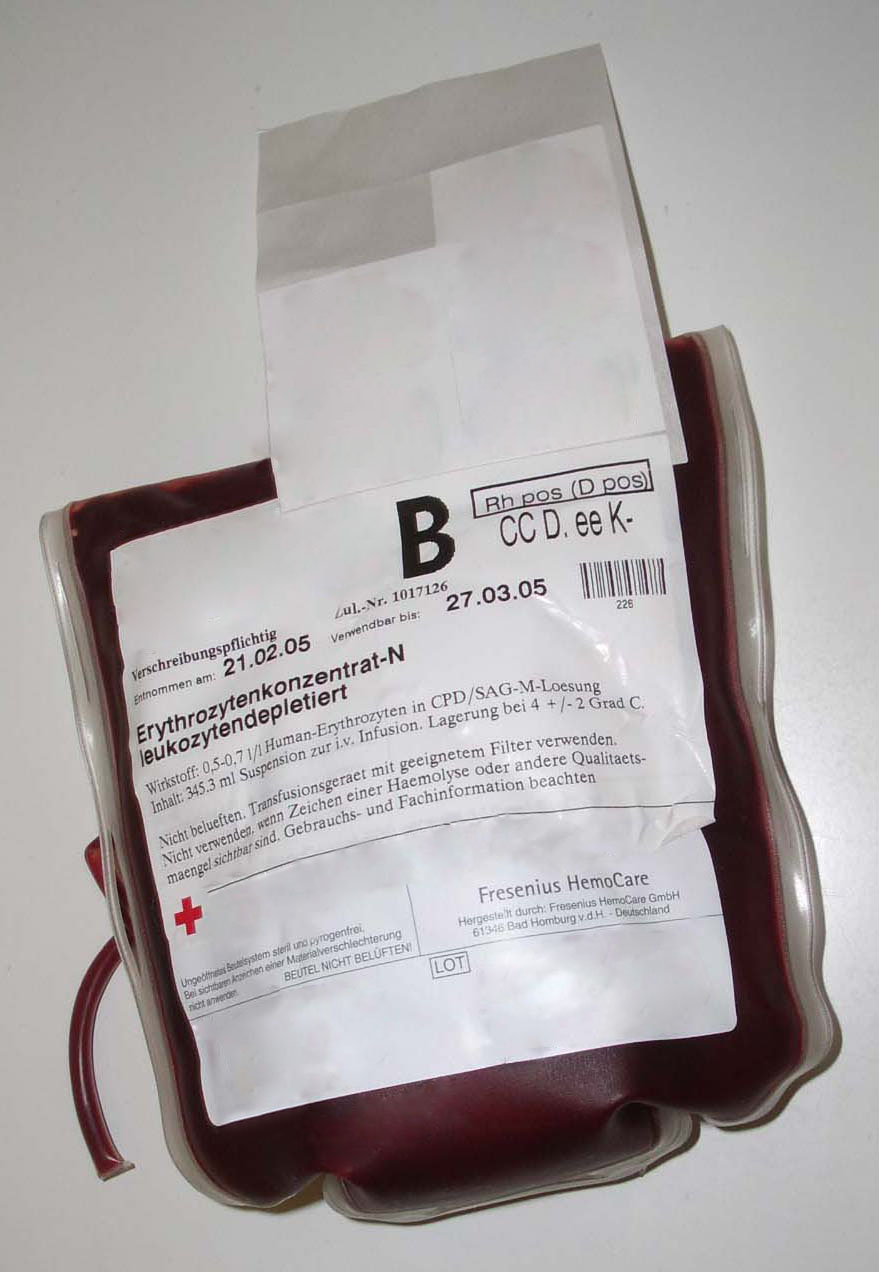
RBC

The treatment of atransferrinemia is apotransferrin. The missing protein without iron. Iron treatment is detrimental as it does not correct the anemia and is a cause of secondary hemochromatosis.

== See also ==
- Transferrin
