= Neurodegeneration with brain iron accumulation =

Group of neurodegenerative disorders with associated iron accumulation in the brain

- Other names: NBIA
- Specialty: Neurology

Neurodegeneration with brain iron accumulation is a heterogenous group of inherited neurodegenerative diseases, still under research, in which iron accumulates in the basal ganglia, either resulting in progressive dystonia, parkinsonism, spasticity, optic atrophy, retinal degeneration, neuropsychiatric, or diverse neurologic abnormalities. Some of the NBIA disorders have also been associated with several genes in synapse and lipid metabolism related pathways. NBIA is not one disease but an entire group of disorders, characterized by an accumulation of brain iron, sometimes in the presence of axonal spheroids in the central nervous system.

Iron accumulation can occur anywhere in the brain, with accumulation typically occurring in globus pallidus, substantia nigra, pars reticula, striatum and cerebellar dentate nuclei. Symptoms can include various movement disorders, neuropsychiatric issues, seizures, visual disturbances, and cognitive decline, usually in different combinations. Ten to fifteen genetic NBIA disorders involving various cell processes have been identified: iron metabolism, coenzyme A biosynthesis, phospholipid metabolism, ceramide metabolism, lysosomal disorders, as well as mutations in genes with unknown functions. Onset can occur at different ages, from early childhood to late adulthood.

As of 2021 there were no curative treatments for any of the NBIA disorders, though several medications have been subject to clinical trial including the iron chelator deferiprone.

== Variants ==
Overview of monogenic NBIA disorders
NBIA variant	Gene	Inheritance
Pantothenate kinase-associated neurodegeneration (PKAN)	PANK2	autosomal recessive
PLA2G6-associated neurodegeneration (PLAN)	PLA2G6	autosomal recessive
Mitochondrial membrane protein-associated neurodegeneration (MPAN)	C19orf12	autosomal recessive or dominant
Beta-propeller protein-associated neurodegeneration (BPAN)	WDR45	X-linked dominant (mostly de novo mutations)
Fatty acid hydroxylase-associated neurodegeneration (FAHN)	FA2H	autosomal recessive
Kufor–Rakeb syndrome	ATP13A2	autosomal recessive
Neuroferritinopathy	FTL, FTH1	autosomal dominant
Aceruloplasminemia	CP	autosomal recessive
Woodhouse–Sakati syndrome	DCAF17	autosomal recessive
COASY protein-associated neurodegeneration (CoPAN)	COASY	autosomal recessive
NBIA7	REPS1	autosomal recessive
NBIA8	CRAT	autosomal recessive

== Diagnosis ==
DaT scans, transcranial Doppler sonography (TCD), PET scans, and, in some cases, magnetic resonance imaging (MRI) (type of scans depending on the symptoms) are used to distinguish between the different forms of NBIA due to the accumulation of iron in different areas of the brain. Patients typically fall into two different categories: (1) early onset, rapid progression or (2) late onset, slow progression. The first type is considered to be the classic presentation, while the second type is thought to be a more atypical presentation. Phenotypes of the different disorders appear to be dependent on age, i.e. amount of iron accumulation and cognitive abilities.

== Treatments ==
Effective disease-modifying treatments have not yet been found for any of the NBIA disorders. Treatment is supportive and focused on improving symptoms: Dystonia is a common debilitating symptom and can be managed with oral medications, and sometimes with deep-brain electrical stimulation, therapy support for walking, eating, and manual tasks is essential. Later, in many of the diseases, slowing and stopping of movement (known as parkinsonism) can become common. Removal of iron, using medications known as iron chelators, has been tested in clinical trial but was not definitively shown to be effective.
