= DNA-binding protein from starved cells =

Group of bacterial ferritin proteins that protect DNA against oxidative damage

Dps (DNA-binding proteins from starved cells)
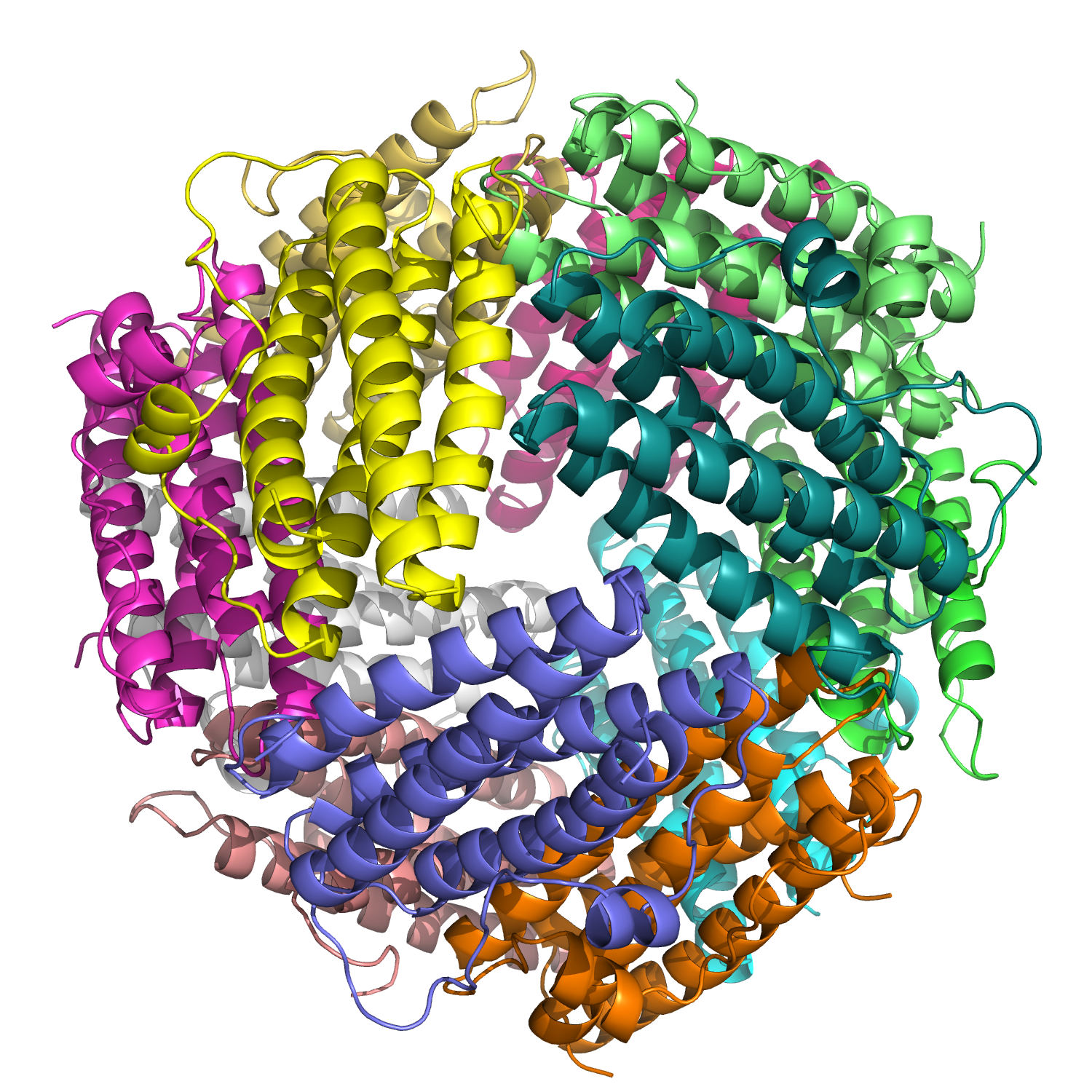
- Structure of the DPS protein (PDB: 1QGH).

Identifiers
- Symbol: DPS
- InterPro: IPR002177
- CDD: cd01043
Available protein structures:
- PDB: IPR002177
- AlphaFold: IPR002177

DNA-binding proteins from starved cells (Dps) are bacterial proteins that belong to the ferritin superfamily and are characterized by strong similarities but also distinctive differences with respect to "canonical" ferritins.

Dps proteins are part of a complex bacterial defence system that protects DNA against oxidative damage and are distributed widely in the bacterial kingdom.

== Description ==
Dps are highly symmetrical dodecameric proteins of 20 kDa characterized from a shell-like structure of 2:3 tetrahedral symmetry assembled from identical subunits with an external diameter of ~ 9 nm and a central cavity of ~ 4.5 nm in diameter. Dps proteins belong to the ferritin superfamily and the DNA protection is afforded by means of a double mechanism:

The first was discovered in Escherichia coli Dps in 1992 and has given the name to the protein family; during stationary phase, Dps binds the chromosome non-specifically, forming a highly ordered and stable Dps-DNA co-crystal within which chromosomal DNA is condensed and protected from diverse damages. The lysine-rich N-terminus is required for self-aggregation as well as for Dps-driven DNA condensation.

The second mode of protection is due to the ability of Dps proteins to bind and oxidize Fe(II) at the characteristic, highly conserved intersubunit ferroxidase center.

The dinuclear ferroxidase centers are located at the interfaces between subunits related by 2-fold symmetry axes. Fe(II) is sequestered and stored in the form of Fe(III) oxyhydroxide mineral, which can be released after reduction. In the mineral iron core up to 500 Fe(III) can be deposited. One hydrogen peroxide oxidizes two Fe^{2+} ions, which prevents hydroxyl radical production by the Fenton reaction (reaction I):

2 Fe^{2+} + H_{2}O_{2} + 2 H^{+} = 2 Fe^{3+} + 2 H_{2}O

Dps also protects the cell from UV and gamma ray irradiation, iron and copper toxicity, thermal stress and acid and base shocks. Also shows a weak catalase activity.

== DNA condensation ==
Dps dodecamers can condense DNA in vitro through a cooperative binding mechanism. Deletion of portions of the N-terminus or mutation of key lysine residues in the N-terminus can impair or eliminate the condensation activity of Dps. Single molecule studies have shown that Dps-DNA complexes can get trapped in long-lived metastable states that exhibit hysteresis. Because of this, the extent of DNA condensation by Dps can depend not only on the current buffer conditions but also on the conditions in the past. A modified Ising model can be used to explain this binding behavior. The nucleation of Dps condensation on DNA requires multiple DNA strands close proximity (similar size as Dps). For instance, Dps shows higher preference towards supercoiled DNA where two DNA strands are in closer vicinity.

== Expression ==
In Escherichia coli Dps protein is Induced by rpoS and IHF in the early stationary phase. Dps is also Induced by oxyR in response to oxidative stress during exponential phase. ClpXP probably directly regulate proteolysis of dps during exponential phase. ClpAP seems to play an indirect role in maintaining ongoing dps synthesis during stationary phase

== Applications ==
=== For nanoparticle synthesis ===
Cavities formed by Dps and ferritin proteins have been successfully used as the reaction chamber for the fabrication of metal nanoparticles (NPs). Protein shells served as a template to restrain particle growth and as a coating to prevent coagulation/aggregation between NPs. Using various sizes of protein shells, various sizes of NPs can be easily synthesized for chemical, physical and bio-medical applications.

=== For enzyme encapsulation ===
Nature utilizes protein-based architectures to house enzymes within its interior cavity, for example: encapsulin and carboxysomes. Taking inspiration from nature, hollow interior cavity of Dps and ferritin cages have also been used to encapsulate enzymes. Cytochrome C, a hemoprotein with peroxidase-like activity when encapsulated inside Dps cage showed better catalytic activity over broad pH range compared to free enzyme in bulk solution. This behavior was attributed to high local concentration of enzyme inside Dps and unique microenvironment provided by Dps interior cavity.

=== For targeted drug delivery ===
Delivery of cargo at intended target site remains major concern for targeted drug delivery owing to presence of biological barriers and enhanced permeability and retention (EPR) effects. Furthermore, formation of protein corona around injected nanoparticles is also a topic of interest within the targeted delivery field. Researchers tried to overcome these concerns by using natural bio-distribution of protein cage nanoparticles for cargo delivery. For example, DNA binding protein from nutrient starved cells (Dps) cage was shown to cross glomerular filtration barrier and target renal proximal tubules.

== See also ==
- Bacterioferritin
- Transferrin
- Ferritin
