= BPAN =

BPAN may refer to:

- Beta-propeller protein-associated neurodegeneration, a form of Neurodegeneration with brain iron accumulation
- Pheromone biosynthesis activating neuropeptide, a hormone found in moths
