= Neuroferritinopathy =

- Other names: Adult-onset basal ganglia disease
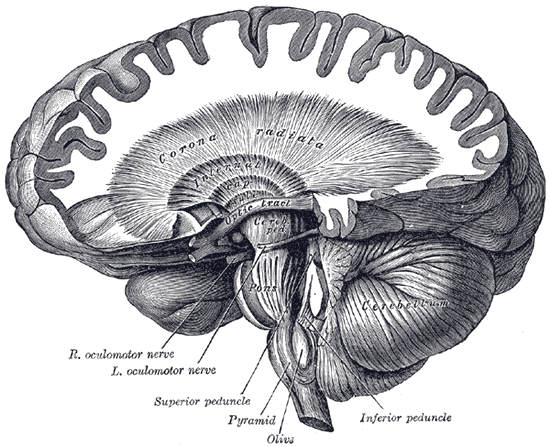
- Cerebellum and basal ganglia
- Specialty: Neurology

Neuroferritinopathy is a genetic neurodegenerative disorder characterized by the accumulation of iron in the basal ganglia, cerebellum, and motor cortex of the human brain. Symptoms, which are extrapyramidal in nature, progress slowly and generally do not become apparent until adulthood. These symptoms include chorea, dystonia, and cognitive deficits which worsen with age.

This disorder is autosomal dominant and is caused by mutations in the gene encoding the light chain subunit of the ferritin protein. Wild type ferritin functions as a buffer for iron, sequestering it and controlling its release. Thus, mutations in the light chain of ferritin result in the accumulation of iron in the brain which can be imaged using MRI. Currently, neuroferritinopathy is the only neurodegenerative disease with an iron accumulation in the brain classified as an autosomal dominant syndrome.

Treatment of neuroferritinopathy is focused on managing symptoms associated with chorea and dystonia using standard medications for each. The disorder is progressive and symptoms become worse with age. Fewer than 100 cases of neuroferritinopathy have been reported since its identification in 2001. Its incidence has been largely localized to Northwest England, significantly in the Cumbria region suggesting a founder effect. Due to its genetic nature, current research is focused on therapeutic management of the symptoms caused by the disorder.

== Signs and symptoms ==
Neuroferritinopathy has several distinguishing signs and symptoms. These fall into two categories: diagnostic findings and physically visible symptoms.

=== Diagnostic findings ===
Symptoms categorized as medically tested and diagnosed include iron accumulation in the brain, basal ganglia cavitation, and neurodegeneration. Patients who are diagnosed with neuroferritinopathy have abnormal iron accumulation in the brain within the neurons and glia of the striatum and cerebellar cortices. Along with the accumulation of iron in the brain, neuroferritinopathy typically causes severe neuronal loss as well. Secondary symptoms may also arise. It is possible that the initial iron accumulation will cause additional neuronal damage and neuronal death. The damaged neurons may be replaced by other cells in an effort to reverse the neurodegeneration. These cells often have a higher iron content. The breakdown of the blood brain barrier may also occur due to the loss of neurons and will subsequently allow more iron to access the brain and accumulate over time.

Neuroferritinopathy is mainly seen in those who have reached late adulthood and is generally seen to slowly progress throughout many decades in a lifetime with the mean age of onset being 39 years old. A loss of cognition is generally only seen with late stages of the disease. Diagnosed patients are seen to retain most of their cognitive functioning until the most progressive stages of the illness sets in.

=== Physical symptoms ===
Symptoms categorized as physically visible symptoms include chorea, dystonia, spasticity, and rigidity, all physical symptoms of the body associated with movement disorders. The symptoms accompanying neuroferritinopathy affecting movement are also progressive, becoming more generalized with time. Usually during the first ten years of onset of the disease only one or two limbs are directly affected. Distinctive symptoms of neuroferritinopathy are chorea, found in 50% of diagnosed patients, dystonia, found in 43% of patients, and parkinsonism, found in 7.5% of patients. Full control of upper limbs on the body generally remains until late onset of the disease. Over time, symptoms seen in a patient can change from one side of the body to the opposite side of the body, jumping from left to right or vice versa. Another route that the physically visible symptoms have been observed to take is the appearance, disappearance, and then reappearance once more of specific symptoms.

While these symptoms are the classic indicators of neuroferritinopathy, symptoms will vary from patient to patient.

== Causes ==
Neuroferritinopathy results from abnormal brain iron accumulation. This iron accumulation is due to mutations in the FTL polypeptide, which is responsible for encoding proteins involved in iron metabolism. Neuroferritinopathy is most commonly caused by a single insertion of the nucleotide adenine into the gene for L-chain ferritin which in turn, alters the carboxyl end of the entire protein chain. However, exact location of the insertion in the exon varies by family. Neuroferritinopathy may also be caused by the insertion of two extra nucleotide bases. The insertion of bases into the L-chain ferritin gene causes the chain to lengthen and alter the sequence of the amino acids found in the gene, also known as a frameshift mutation.

These mutations result in decreased iron-binding ability. The oxidative damage caused by increased iron leads to apoptosis, or programmed cell death. Accumulation of iron in the brain is extremely dangerous as excess iron catalyzes the formation of free radicals, which have damaging effects to the brain. The iron accumulation characteristic of neuroferritinopathy particularly affects the cerebellum, basal ganglia, and motor cortex regions of the brain.

== Mechanism ==
The protein ferritin functions to sequester and release iron, acting as an iron buffering system in cells. Iron is essential to brain function in oxygen transport and cellular metabolism for example. However, careful control of iron is important as increased brain iron levels catalyze the formation of free radicals that create oxidative molecules via the Fenton Reaction. These oxidative molecules can cause oxidative brain damage. Iron that is bound to ferritin in nonreactive.

Fenton Reaction

(1) Fe^{2+} + H_{2}O_{2} → Fe^{3+} + HO• + OH^{−}

(2) Fe^{3+} + H_{2}O_{2} → Fe^{2+} + HOO• + H^{+}

The ferritin protein is made up of heavy chain (H) and light chain (L) subunits. In neuroferritinopathy, the gene encoding the light chain is mutated. Several different mutation variations have led to diagnosis as neuroferritinopathy; all of these mutations occur in the light chain. A mutated light chain is believed to inhibit ferritin's ability to effectively sequester and hold iron. Without control of iron, it is free to cause oxidative brain damage as described above.

The concentration of iron in a healthy brain varies greatly from region to region. The specific regions of the brain that are associated with motor functions appear to have larger accumulations of iron than non-motor-related regions. This observation of varying iron concentrations is a possible explanation for the correlation between movement disorders and the iron imbalance within the central nervous system.

== Diagnosis ==
Neuroferritinopathy is primarily diagnosed in older adults, specifically in adults affected by Alzheimer's disease or Parkinson's disease, as iron accumulates in the brain over long periods of time. Neuroferritinopathy is diagnosed using either neuroimaging techniques, physiological tests, or genetic testing.

=== Classification ===
Neuroferritinopathy was originally described with hallmark features of neurodegeneration and iron accumulation in the brain, leading it to be classified with other neurodegeneration with brain iron accumulation (NBIA) disorders which share similar symptoms and imaging findings. Over time single-gene causes have been found for many NBIA disorders, like neuroferritinopathy. Before the availability of genetic testing, all such disorders were considered together and known as Hallervorden-Spatz syndrome, a term which is no longer used due to the Nazi party ties of the namesakes. Brain iron disorders are now divided into three categories: genetic neurodegeneration with brain iron accumulation, genetic systemic iron accumulation with neurologic features, and acquired diseases associated with iron excess or iron deficiency. Neuroferritinopathy is classified under the first category. Neuroferritinopathy is classified as a late-onset basal ganglia disease and is a dominantly inherited neurodegenerative disease. Four different alleles are responsible for neuroferritinopathy. Three arise from nucleotide insertions in the ferritin light chain (FTL) polypeptide gene while the fourth arises from a missense mutation in the FTL gene.

=== Neuroimaging ===
MRI

Neuroferritinopathy is most commonly diagnosed using MRI and other neuroimaging techniques. MRIs help identify the iron deposits in the cerebellum, basal ganglia, and motor cortex common to neuroferritinopathy. MRIs of affected individuals also show mild cerebellar and cerebral atrophy, or tissue breakdown, and gas cavity formation in the putamen. Most importantly, the MRIs show misfolded ferritin proteins and iron deposits in the glial cells of the caudate, putamen, globus pallidus, cerebral cortex, thalamus, and purkinje cells, causing neuronal death in these areas.

=== Physiological testing ===
Blood tests usually come back normal in affected individuals so they do not serve as a reliable means of diagnosis. Blood tests can show low serum ferritin levels. However this is unreliable as method of diagnosis since some patients show typical serum ferritin levels even at the latest stages of neuroferritinopathy. Cerebral spinal fluid tests also are typically normal. Ferritin aggregates found in the skin, liver, kidney and muscle tissues may help in diagnosing neuroferritinopathy. More cytochrome c oxidase-negative fibers are also often found in the muscle biopsies of affected individuals.

=== Genetic testing ===
Genetic testing can confirm a neuroferritinopathy diagnosis. A diagnosis can be made by analyzing the protein sequences of affected individuals and comparing them to known neuroferritinopathy sequences.

== Treatment ==
Due to neuroferritinopathy's genetic etiology, the disorder is not currently curable. Furthermore, progression of the disorder cannot be effectively halted. Therefore current treatment focuses on managing symptoms of the disorder. No medication is available to treat all symptoms. Botox has been shown to help with focal dystonia. The dopamine depleter Tetrabenazine shown to help with involuntary movements. Symptoms affecting movement (dystonia) have also been treated with L-Dopa, orphenadrine, benzhexol, sulpiride, diazepam, clonazepam, and deanol. Parkinsonian symptoms were not decreased by L-Dopa. Iron supplements should be avoided.

== Epidemiology ==
Map of England

Neuroferritinopathy was first discovered in 2001, with its first case being reported in Cumbria from Northern England. The discovery of neuroferritinopathy was mediated by a study done on a large family suffering from a dominantly inherited basal ganglia disease. It was reported that the disease was instigated by a mutation on the ferritin light chain polypeptide (FTL1) and was found to cause iron accumulation in the brain and neurodegeneration. Following the location of the first case of Neuroferritinopathy, the majority of patients diagnosed with the disease have also been found in Northern and Northeast England. The localization of the majority of cases to Northern and Northeast England suggests that a common ancestor may be responsible for many or possibly all cases. Despite there being fewer than 100 cases reported and the disease's general location of Northern and Northeast England, many more cases of neuroferritinopathy have been diagnosed around the rest of the world in recent years.

== Research ==
New potential treatment options being researched are Venesection (removing red blood cells), Iron chelation with deferiprone, and Coenzyme Q10 (ubiquinone).
