= Light chain =

A light chain is the small polypeptide subunit of a protein complex.

More specifically, it can refer to:

- Immunoglobulin light chain
- Ferritin light chain
- Myosin light chain
- Kinesin light chain
- Dynein light chain

Light chain may also refer to:

- Mail (armour)
