= WIPI2 =

Protein-coding gene in the species Homo sapiens

Identifiers
- Aliases: WIPI2, ATG18B, Atg21, WIPI-2, CGI-50, WD repeat domain, phosphoinositide interacting 2, IDDSSA
- External IDs: OMIM: 609225; MGI: 1923831; GeneCards: WIPI2

Gene location (Human)
Chr.	Chromosome 7 (human)
Band	7p22.1	Start	5,190,196 bp
Band	7p22.1	End	5,233,840 bp

Gene location (Mouse)
Chr.	Chromosome 5 (mouse)
Band	5|5 G2	Start	142,613,453 bp
Band	5|5 G2	End	142,656,343 bp
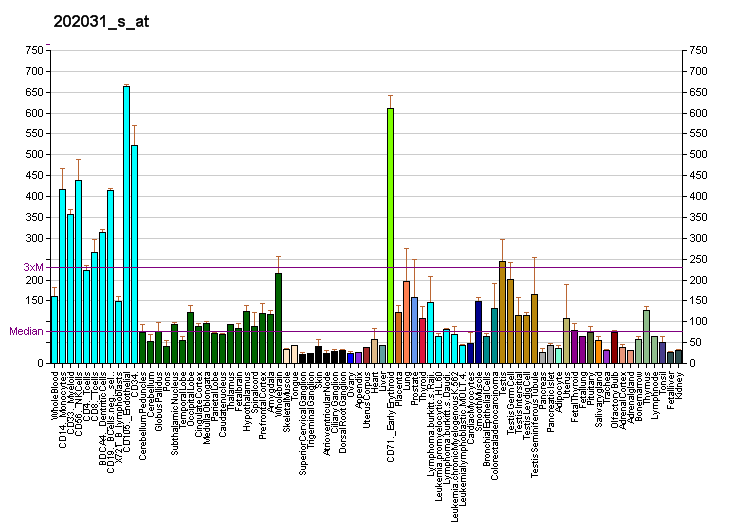

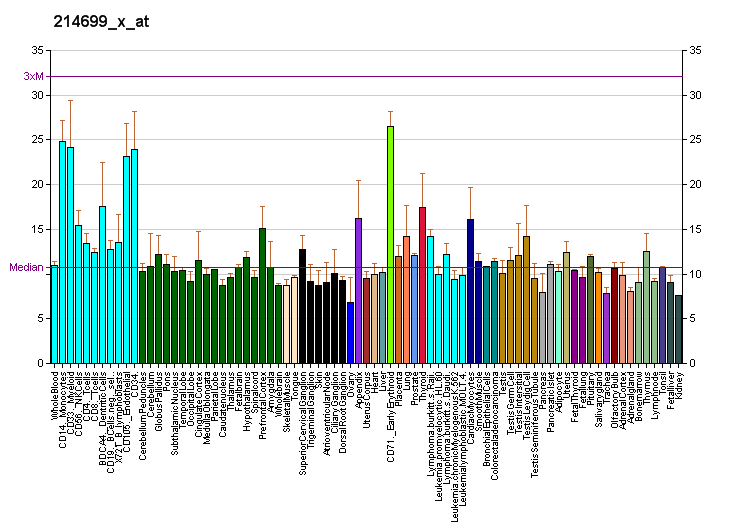

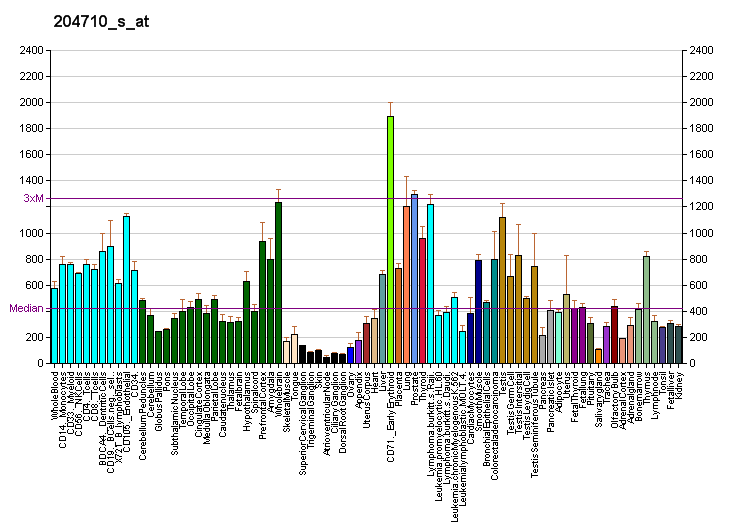
RNA expression pattern
Bgee	Human / Mouse (ortholog); Top expressed in: middle temporal gyrus; Brodmann area 23; nipple; olfactory bulb; beta cell; inferior ganglion of vagus nerve; ventral tegmental area; parotid gland; pons; endothelial cell / Top expressed in: spermatocyte; lacrimal gland; right kidney; dorsomedial hypothalamic nucleus; morula; morula; dentate gyrus of hippocampal formation granule cell; superior frontal gyrus; vestibular membrane of cochlear duct; spermatid; More reference expression data
BioGPS	More reference expression data
Gene ontology
Molecular function	phosphatidylinositol-5-phosphate binding; protein binding; phosphatidylinositol-3-phosphate binding; phosphatidylinositol-3,5-bisphosphate binding; lipid binding
Cellular component	autophagosome; cytosol; phagophore assembly site membrane; membrane; phagophore assembly site; extrinsic component of membrane; nucleoplasm; protein-containing complex
Biological process	autophagy; autophagosome maturation; macroautophagy; autophagosome assembly; autophagy of mitochondrion; protein lipidation; autophagy of nucleus; protein localization to phagophore assembly site; protein lipidation involved in autophagosome assembly; xenophagy; cellular response to starvation
Sources:Amigo / QuickGO
Orthologs
Databases	NCBI: entry; OMA: entry
Species	Human	Mouse
Entrez	26100	74781
Ensembl	ENSG00000157954	ENSMUSG00000029578
UniProt	Q9Y4P8	Q80W47
RefSeq (mRNA)	NM_001033518; NM_001033519; NM_001033520; NM_001278299; NM_015610 NM_016003	NM_178398
RefSeq (protein)	NP_001028690; NP_001028691; NP_001028692; NP_001265228; NP_056425 NP_057087; NP_056425.1	NP_848485
Location (UCSC)	Chr 7: 5.19 – 5.23 Mb	Chr 5: 142.61 – 142.66 Mb
PubMed search
- Wikidata
View/Edit Human	View/Edit Mouse

WD repeat domain phosphoinositide-interacting protein 2 is a protein that in humans is encoded by the WIPI2 gene.

== Function ==
WD40 repeat proteins are key components of many essential biologic functions. They regulate the assembly of multiprotein complexes by presenting a beta-propeller platform for simultaneous and reversible protein-protein interactions. Members of the WIPI subfamily of WD40 repeat proteins, such as WIPI2, have a 7-bladed propeller structure and contain a conserved motif for interaction with phospholipids.

WIPI2 is the mammalian homolog of Atg18, not Atg21, along with the closely related protein, WIPI1. WIPI2 mRNA is readily detectable in several commonly used laboratory cell lines (HEK293A, HeLa, A431) and several cancer cell lines, while WIPI1 expression is limited to cancer cells (but is also detected in many human tissues).

The Atg proteins regulate autophagy, which is a lysosomal degradation pathway required for maintaining cell health, surviving periods of nutrient deprivation and also plays a role in cancer, neurodegeneration and immune responses to a diverse range of pathogens. WIPI2 is recruited early to the forming autophagosome, along with DFCP-1, ULK-1 and Atg16, where it positively regulates the lipidation of Atg8 (LC3). This is not true for WIPI1. It was shown the WIPI2 players an important role in lysosomes regulation.

== See also ==
- WIPI protein family
