= Beta-propeller protein-associated neurodegeneration =

Neurodegenerative disorder with brain iron accumulation

- Other names: Static encephalopathy of childhood with neurodegeneration in adulthood (SENDA), Neurodegeneration with brain iron accumulation 5
- Specialty: Neurology
- Symptoms: Developmental delay, seizures, mental handicap. In 2nd and 3rd decade patients develop parkinsonism or dystonia
- Treatment: Anticonvulsant, ketogenic diet, and vagus nerve stimulation might be used for seizures, and DBS for dystonia

Beta-propeller protein-associated neurodegeneration (BPAN), previously known as static encephalopathy of childhood with neurodegeneration in adulthood (SENDA), is a rare hereditary X-linked dominant disorder caused by a mutation in the WDR45 gene. BPAN belongs to a class of disorders called neurodegeneration with brain iron accumulation (NBIA), which causes brain iron elevation and neurodegeneration. Patients with BPAN develop symptoms, such as early-onset developmental delay, seizures, and further neurological decline, such as dystonia, parkinsonism, and dementia, which develops by early adulthood. BPAN is one of the most common NBIA disorders.

As of 2024, 123 individuals with BPAN have been identified. There are more females than males with this disease due to nonviability in males with germline mutations because males have only one X chromosome, where the WDR45 gene is located. The patient with the oldest onset of degeneration is 50 years old as of 2023.

== Symptoms ==
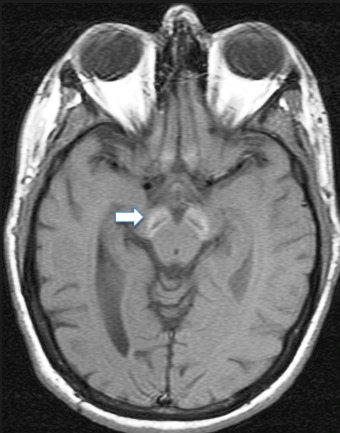
A "halo" in the substantia nigra

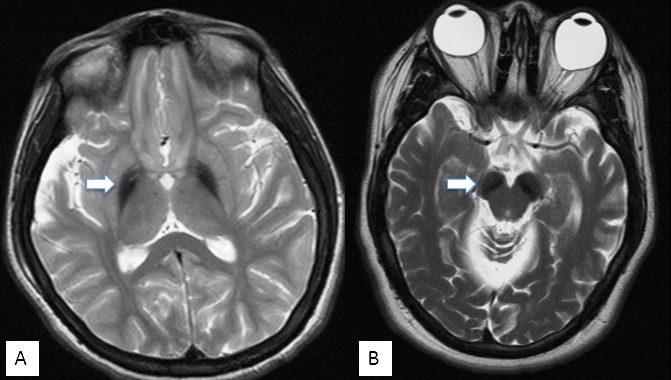
Hypointensity in substantia nigra and globus pallidus, indicating iron accumulation in these parts of the brain

Patients with BPAN might experience symptoms, such as dysautonomia, abnormal eye movements, atrophy of the cerebrum and cerebellum, slow movements, dementia, frontal release signs, developmental delay with intellectual disability, poor speech, parkinsonism, encephalopathy, rigidity, trouble sleeping, and tremors. Patients might occasionally experience aggressive behaviour and optic atrophy. Seizures often start as febrile seizures. Various seizure types have been reported in BPAN, such as absence seizures, myoclonic seizures, generalised tonic-clonic seizures, epileptic spasms and atonic seizures. Some patients experienced precocious adrenarche as young as one to two years of age. Patients can also experience eyesight issues, such as myopia, astigmatism, strabismus, and amblyopia.

On MRI scans of the brain, accumulation of iron in the globus pallidus and substantia nigra can be seen, with a "halo" T1 hyperintense signal in the substantia nigra. Patients with WDR45 mutations might also experience Rett-like syndrome, intellectual disability, West syndrome, early infantile developmental and epileptic encephalopathy, and developmental and epileptic encephalopathy.

== Diagnosis ==
Diagnosis is often suspected based on clinical findings that typically emerge in early childhood, including:

- The onset of multiple types of seizures, which are most severe during childhood and often diminish with age
- Abnormal behaviour, such as teeth grinding while awake or repetitive hand movements
- Developmental delay or intellectual disabilities, frequently accompanied by speech impairments

MRI findings may also indicate the disorder, showing hypomyelination (a deficiency in myelin deposition) and a small corpus callosum, on T_{1}-weighted images and a small corpus callosum. On T1-weighted images, a "halo"-like structure may be visible within the substantia nigra, while T2-weighted images often reveal iron accumulation in both the substantia nigra and the globus pallidus.

Confirmation of diagnosis can be made via genetic testing. If a patient with BPAN has typical features of the disorder, a targeted sequencing of the gene can be made; but in case of symptoms indistinguishable from other disorders, a whole genome/exome sequencing can confirm diagnosis. Rarely, gene-targeted deletion/duplication analysis techniques (such as: long-range PCR) can be used to detect deletion of WDR45 gene.

== Cause ==
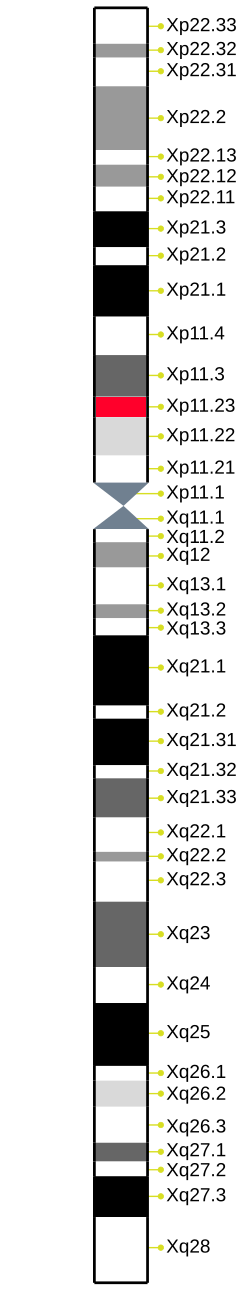
WDR45 gene is localised on Xp11.23 region (marked with red).

BPAN is caused by a mutation in the WDR45 gene. Most people with BPAN have a new mutation, which means that mutation is new and none of the parents have it. Although, there have been cases of people inheriting the pathogenic variant of WDR45 from an asymptomatic parent due to mosaicism. Male patients with BPAN usually have somatic mosaicism, which, in turn, might range from mild BPAN to the classic form of BPAN, although males with germline mutations can have symptoms worse than typical female cases. The spectrum of symptoms in females is not only ranged by somatic mosaicism but also by X-chromosome inactivation, a process where one of the X chromosomes is randomly "turned off"; non-random inactivation might influence the phenotype.

== Pathophysiology ==
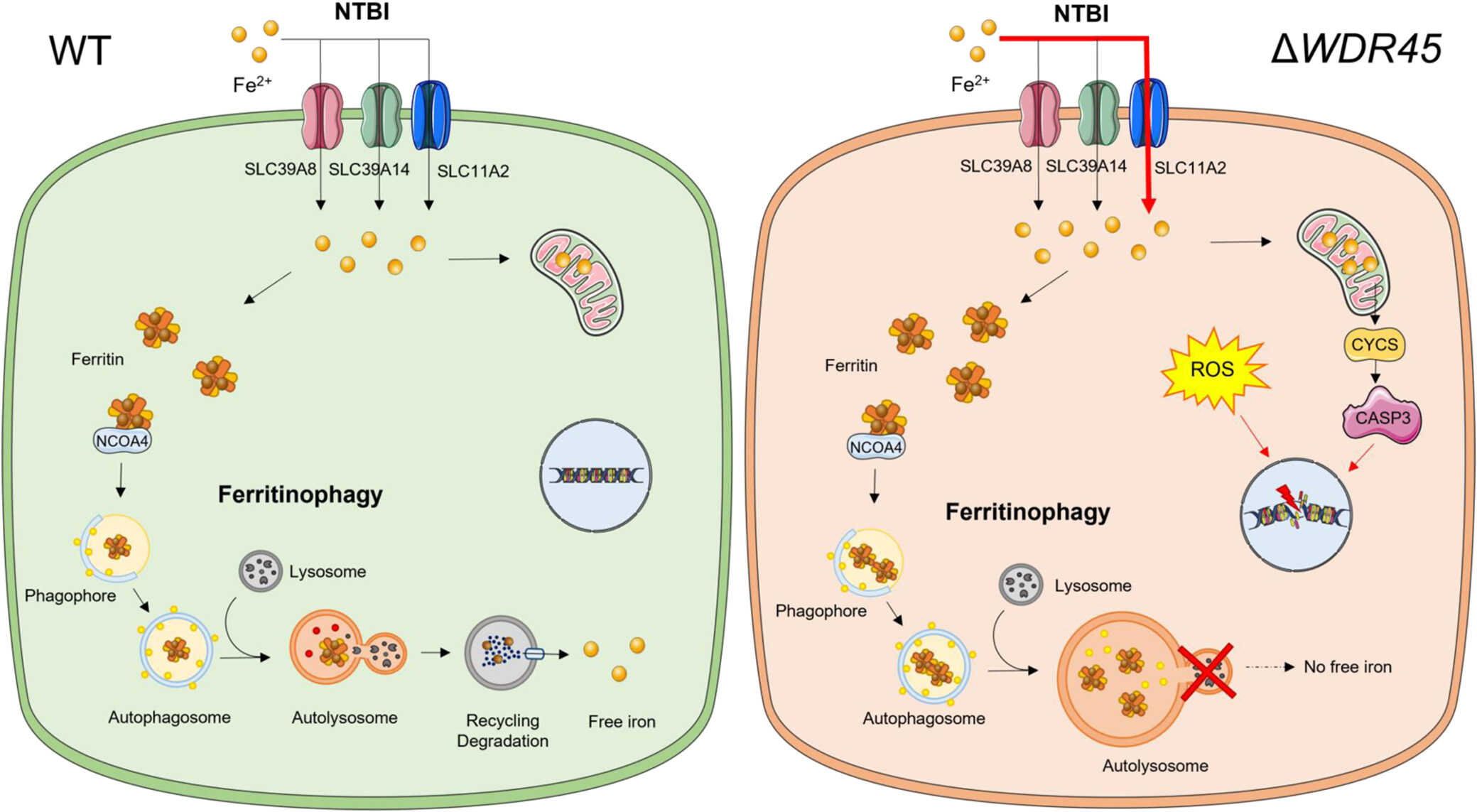
This illustration shows that in WDR45-deficient cells, the non-TF (transferrin)-bound iron pathway is upregulated (due to abnormal ferritinophagy) and iron accumulates in cells and mitochondria, which causes apoptosis.

In the cell-line model of BPAN, researchers found that WDR45 deficiency impairs ferritinophagy, a process where ferritin is targeted and degraded; consequently, iron is released in lysosomes. Due to impairment of ferritinophagy, non-TF (transferrin)-bound iron pathway predominates iron transport, which causes accumulation of iron in cells and mitochondria. Due to the accumulation of iron in mitochondria, its function is impaired by impairing mitochondrial respiration; also, iron goes into a Fenton reaction and generates reactive oxygen species, which is harmful to cells and can initiate apoptosis (a form of programmed cell death) and neurodegeneration. Furthermore, WDR45 deficiency induces endoplasmic reticulum stress-dependent autophagy of FTH1 (ferritin heavy chain) and GPX4, which causes iron accumulation and lipid peroxidation. Also, accumulation of lipofuscin – an indicator of oxidised lipid aggregates – can be seen. WDR45 deficiency promotes abnormal localisation of ATG2A to endoplasmic reticulum-mitochondria contact sites, which enhances transmission of phosphatidylserine (to mitochondria), and consequently phosphatidylethanolamine is synthesised. Phosphatidylethanolamine is highly sensitive to peroxidation; due to this, cells are driven to lipid damage by iron and cause ferroptosis. Fatty acid synthase is not degraded in WDR45 deficiency, which causes lipid droplet accumulation and might contribute to disease progression due to excess lipid droplet toxicity.

WDR45 participates in the disassembly of stress granules by competing with G3BP1, which in turn releases the caprin-1 protein – which is also implicated in neurodevelopmental disorders. In BPAN, this function is lost, which might provide a link between neurodevelopmental and neurodegenerative phenotypes.

== Treatment ==
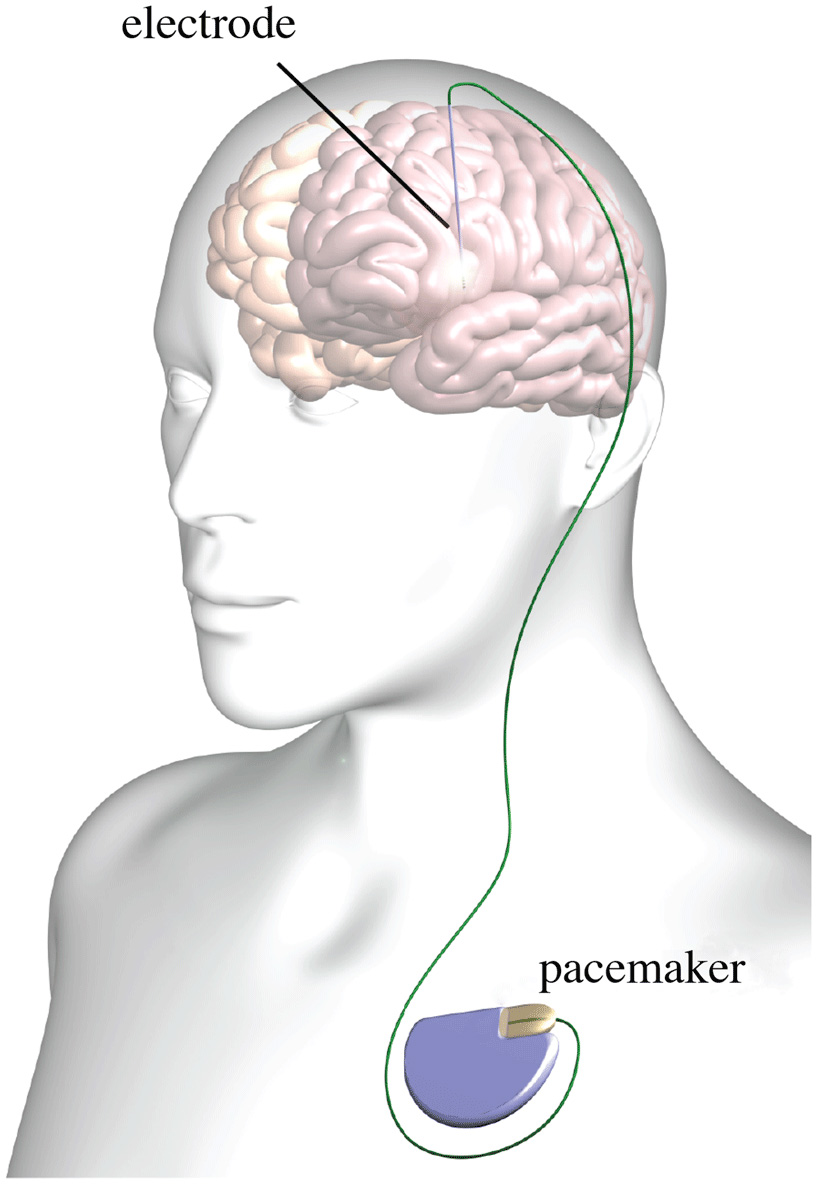
Deep brain stimulation can be used for dystonia in older patients with BPAN.

This disease does not have a cure, but management of symptoms is possible. Anti-seizure medications are generally used to control seizures; a ketogenic diet and vagus nerve stimulation can also be used. Deep brain stimulation can be used for dystonia in older patients with BPAN. Early involvement of patients in speech, physical, and occupational therapy might benefit them and might maximise their developmental potential.

Iron chelation therapy had been tried but did not show any results. One patient experienced worsening of parkinsonism, which caused withdrawal of the medication.

== Research ==
In 2024, researchers successfully skipped an abnormal pseudoexon – a sequence that resembles an exon, which mutations can activate, causing aberrant protein formation/frameshift or premature termination of translation – in fibroblasts derived from a patient with BPAN, using ASOs, which could prevent or attenuate the onset of extrapyramidal (such as parkinsonism) symptoms.

In 2025, researchers found that biotin (vitamin B7) might increase WDR45 transcription on inactive X chromosomes (by X-chromosome reactivation) in BPAN female patients' fibroblasts through histone biotinylation, a process where biotin is attached to histones. Researchers successfully reversed the BPAN phenotype in a mouse using AAV-mediated gene transfer by transferring a normal copy of the gene in the brain.

== History ==
BPAN was first described by Allison Gregory, Brenda Polster, and Susan Hayflick in 2009, when patients initially experienced developmental delays and then developed parkinsonism in their 20s or 30s, to which some patients responded well to levodopa.The disorder was originally called "Static encephalopathy of childhood with neurodegeneration in adulthood" until 2012, when Haack and his colleagues found the causing gene and proposed the name "Beta-propeller protein-associated neurodegeneration."
