= MPAN =

MPAN is an acronym that can refer to:

- Meter Point Administration Number, a reference number used in Great Britain to uniquely identify electricity supply points
- Mitochondrial membrane protein-associated neurodegeneration, a rare disease that is a form of neurodegeneration with brain iron accumulation
- MPAN (TV channel), Montana Public Affairs Network
