= Bacterioferritin =

Bacterial protein similar to ferritin

Bacterioferritin (Bfr) is an oligomeric protein containing both a binuclear iron centre and haem b. The tertiary and quaternary structure of Bfr is very similar to that of ferritin. The physiological functions of BFR, which may be other than just iron uptake, are not clear.

== Structure ==
The structure of Bfr has been determined by x-ray crystallography. Bfr forms a roughly spherical, hollow shell from 24 identical subunits, incorporating 12 haem groups. Structure of a monoclinic crystal form of cytochrome b1 (bacterioferritin) from E-coli Iron is stored as a hydrated ferric oxide mineral in its central cavity (about 80 Å diameter). The overall complex has cubic (432) symmetry. Each subunit includes a binuclear metalbinding site (the diiron site) linking together the four major helices of the subunit, which has been identified as the ferroxidase active site.

Bfr from Pseudomonas aeruginosa (PaBfr), unlike other Bfrs, is found to contain two subunit types, which differ considerably in their amino acid sequences. A similar hetero-assembly is seen in the ferritins of higher eukaryotes.

Bfr from Escherichia coli (EcBfr) which naturally shows structural instability and an incomplete self-assembly behavior by populating two oligomerization states has been used as a model for studies on the self-assembly of minimal protein nano-cages.
