= WDR45L =

Protein-coding gene in the species Homo sapiens

WDR45B

Identifiers
- Aliases: WDR45B, WDR45L, WIPI-3, WIPI3, WD repeat domain 45B, NEDSBAS
- External IDs: OMIM: 609226; MGI: 1914090; GeneCards: WDR45B

Gene location (Human)
Chr.	Chromosome 17 (human)
Band	17q25.3	Start	82,614,562 bp
Band	17q25.3	End	82,648,553 bp

Gene location (Mouse)
Chr.	Chromosome 11 (mouse)
Band	11 E2|11 85.24 cM	Start	121,218,050 bp
Band	11 E2|11 85.24 cM	End	121,245,271 bp
RNA expression pattern
Bgee	Human / Mouse (ortholog); Top expressed in: secondary oocyte; epithelium of nasopharynx; beta cell; right uterine tube; mucosa of pharynx; nasal epithelium; gingival epithelium; epithelium of bronchus; skin of arm; bronchial epithelial cell / Top expressed in: epiblast; neural tube; ovary; mesencephalon; placenta; dentate gyrus of hippocampal formation granule cell; granulocyte; ventricular zone; ganglionic eminence; heart; More reference expression data
BioGPS	n/a
Gene ontology
Molecular function	phosphatidylinositol-3-phosphate binding; phosphatidylinositol-3,5-bisphosphate binding; protein binding; TSC1-TSC2 complex binding; lipid binding
Cellular component	cytosol; extrinsic component of membrane; phagophore assembly site membrane; phagophore assembly site; lysosome
Biological process	protein lipidation; protein localization to phagophore assembly site; autophagy of mitochondrion; autophagy of nucleus; autophagosome assembly; cellular response to starvation; autophagy
Sources:Amigo / QuickGO
Orthologs
Databases	NCBI: entry; OMA: entry
Species	Human	Mouse
Entrez	56270	66840
Ensembl	ENSG00000141580	ENSMUSG00000025173
UniProt	Q5MNZ6	Q9CR39
RefSeq (mRNA)	NM_019613	NM_025793
RefSeq (protein)	NP_062559	NP_080069
Location (UCSC)	Chr 17: 82.61 – 82.65 Mb	Chr 11: 121.22 – 121.25 Mb
PubMed search
- Wikidata
View/Edit Human	View/Edit Mouse

WD repeat domain phosphoinositide-interacting protein 3 (WIPI-3), also known as WD repeat-containing protein 45-like, is a protein that in humans is encoded by the gene WDR45B (previously WDR45L).

== Structure and function ==
WIPI-3 is a member of the WIPI or SVP1 family of WD40 repeat-containing proteins. The protein contains seven WD40 repeats that are thought to fold into a beta-propeller structure that mediates protein–protein interactions, and a conserved motif for interaction with phospholipids.

== See also ==
- WIPI protein family
