= Woodhouse–Sakati syndrome =

- Woodhouse–Sakati syndrome has an autosomal recessive pattern of inheritance.
- Specialty: Genetics
- Frequency: Fewer than 1 in 1,000,000

Woodhouse–Sakati syndrome, is a rare autosomal recessive multisystem disorder which causes malformations throughout the body, and deficiencies affecting the endocrine system.

== Presentation ==
The syndrome is characterized by progressive hair thinning in childhood that often progresses to alopecia, hypogonadism (which becomes evident at puberty), hypothyroidism, hearing loss, mild intellectual disability, diabetes mellitus, progressive extrapyramidal movements (dystonic spasms, dystonic posturing, dysarthria, dysphagia). Electrocardiogram anomalies have also been reported.

== Genetics ==
Mutations in the C2orf37 gene, located at human chromosome 2q22.3-q35, are believed to be a cause of Woodhouse–Sakati syndrome. The disorder is inherited in an autosomal recessive manner. This means the defective gene responsible for the disorder is located on an autosome (chromosome 2 is an autosome), and two copies of the defective gene (one inherited from each parent) are required in order to be born with the disorder. The parents of an individual with an autosomal recessive disorder both carry one copy of the defective gene, but usually do not experience any signs or symptoms of the disorder.

== Diagnosis ==
Like with most other NBIA diseases, a T2-sequence MRI is used to detect iron accumulation in the brain. A blood test can also be used to detect low insulin-like growth factor 1 levels.

Diagnosis of Woodhouse-Sakati syndrome requires genetic testing of the DCAF17 gene, which scans for two specific gene changes. The testing begins with sequence analysis, and if no changes are found, continues with deletion and duplication analysis.

== Treatment ==
the associated Oro-mandibular dystonia can be treated with Hegab TMJ splint.
