= WIPI protein family =

The WIPI protein family (WD-repeat protein Interacting with PhosphoInositides) is an evolutionarily conserved family of proteins. WIPI proteins contain a WD repeat domain that folds into a 7-bladed beta-propeller that functions in autophagy, and contain a conserved motif for interaction with phospholipids.

Members of this family include:

Protein	Gene	Aliases	Yeast
WIPI-1	WIPI1	WIPI49, FLJ10055	Atg18
WIPI-2	WIPI2	Svp1a, DKFZP434J154 WIPI49-like protein 2	Atg21
WIPI-3	WDR45L	628 protein, WIPI49-like protein	
WIPI-4	WDR45	JM5 protein, WDRX1	
