= Mitochondrial ferritin =

Protein-coding gene in the species Homo sapiens

FTMT
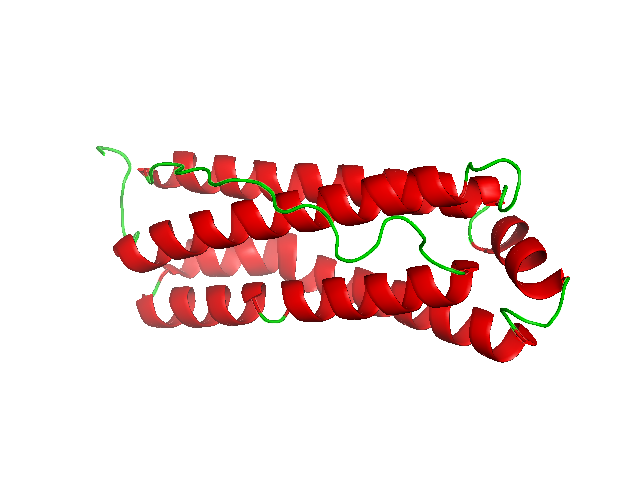

Identifiers
- Aliases: FTMT, MTF, Mitochondrial ferritin, ferritin mitochondrial
- External IDs: OMIM: 608847; MGI: 1914884; GeneCards: FTMT
Available structures
PDB	Ortholog search: PDBe RCSB
PDB	List of PDB id codes 1R03
Enzyme activity
EC #	BRENDA	ExPASy	KEGG	MetaCyc
1.16.3.1	↗	↗	↗	↗

Gene location (Human)
Chr.	Chromosome 5 (human)
Band	5q23.1	Start	121,851,882 bp
Band	5q23.1	End	121,852,833 bp

Gene location (Mouse)
Chr.	Chromosome 18 (mouse)
Band	18|18 D1	Start	52,464,621 bp
Band	18|18 D1	End	52,466,068 bp
RNA expression pattern
Bgee	Human / Mouse (ortholog); Top expressed in: gonad; left testis; right testis; olfactory zone of nasal mucosa; human musculoskeletal system; skeletal muscle; lower limb muscles; muscle of leg; gastrocnemius muscle; subcutaneous adipose tissue / Top expressed in: seminiferous tubule; spermatid; spermatocyte; pancreas; islet of Langerhans; More reference expression data
BioGPS	n/a
Gene ontology
Molecular function	ferric iron binding; metal ion binding; oxidoreductase activity; iron ion binding; ferroxidase activity; ferrous iron binding; identical protein binding
Cellular component	nucleus; mitochondrion; mitochondrial matrix; cytoplasm
Biological process	iron ion transport; positive regulation of succinate dehydrogenase activity; positive regulation of aconitate hydratase activity; positive regulation of cell population proliferation; positive regulation of lyase activity; intracellular sequestering of iron ion; cellular iron ion homeostasis
Sources:Amigo / QuickGO
Orthologs
Databases	NCBI: entry; OMA: entry
Species	Human	Mouse
Entrez	94033	67634
Ensembl	ENSG00000181867	ENSMUSG00000024510
UniProt	Q8N4E7	Q9D5H4
RefSeq (mRNA)	NM_177478	NM_026286
RefSeq (protein)	NP_803431	NP_080562
Location (UCSC)	Chr 5: 121.85 – 121.85 Mb	Chr 18: 52.46 – 52.47 Mb
PubMed search
- Wikidata
View/Edit Human	View/Edit Mouse

Mitochondrial ferritin is a ferroxidase enzyme that in humans is encoded by the FTMT gene.

It is classified as a metal-binding protein which is located within the mitochondria. After the protein is taken up by the mitochondria it can be processed into a mature protein and assemble functional ferritin shells.

== Structure ==
Its structure was determined at 1.70 Å through the use of X-ray diffraction and contains 182 residues. It is 67% helical. The Ramachandran plot shows that the structure of mitochondrial ferritin is mainly alpha helical with a low prevalence of beta sheets.
