= WDR45 =

Protein-coding gene in humans

Identifiers
- Aliases: WDR45, NBIA4, NBIA5, WDRX1, WIPI-4, WIPI4, JM5, WD repeat domain 45
- External IDs: OMIM: 300526; MGI: 1859606; GeneCards: WDR45

Gene location (Human)
Chr.	X chromosome (human)
Band	Xp11.23	Start	49,074,433 bp
Band	Xp11.23	End	49,101,170 bp

Gene location (Mouse)
Chr.	X chromosome (mouse)
Band	X A1.1|X 3.48 cM	Start	7,714,333 bp
Band	X A1.1|X 3.48 cM	End	7,728,206 bp
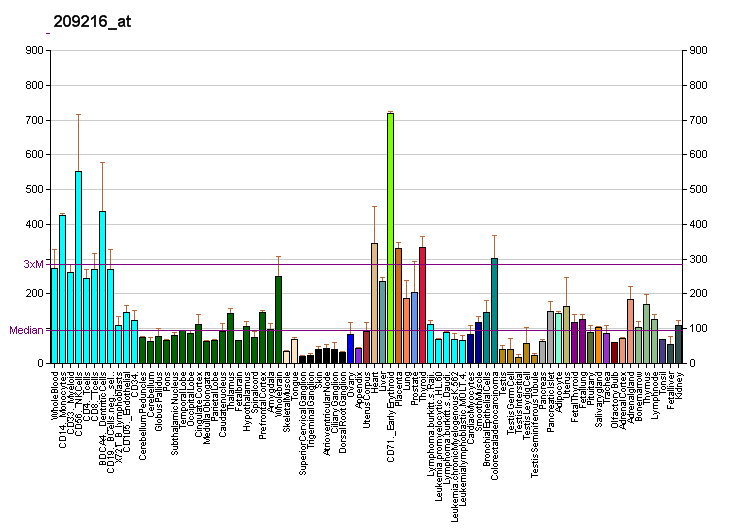

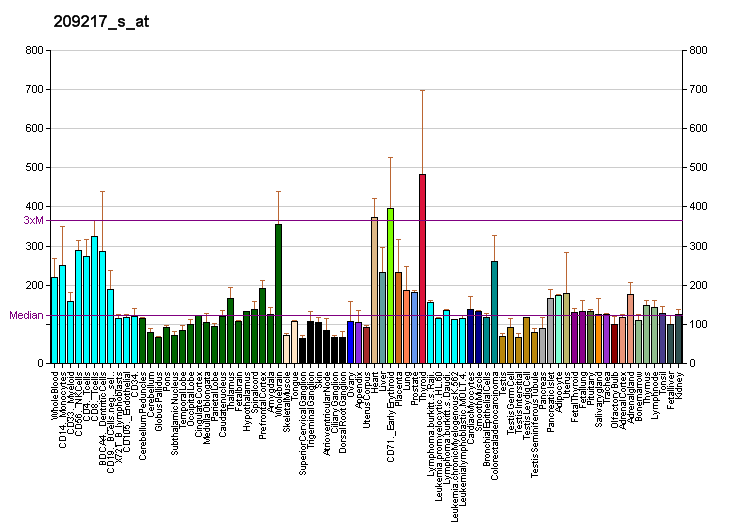
RNA expression pattern
Bgee	Human / Mouse (ortholog); Top expressed in: apex of heart; gastric mucosa; granulocyte; right adrenal gland; right adrenal cortex; left adrenal cortex; canal of the cervix; right lobe of thyroid gland; left lobe of thyroid gland; body of stomach / Top expressed in: morula; morula; left lung lobe; granulocyte; neural layer of retina; right lung lobe; right kidney; muscle of thigh; superior frontal gyrus; saccule; More reference expression data
BioGPS	More reference expression data
Gene ontology
Molecular function	phosphatidylinositol-3-phosphate binding; phosphatidylinositol-3,5-bisphosphate binding; protein binding; protein kinase binding; phosphatidylinositol phosphate binding; lipid binding
Cellular component	cytosol; phagophore assembly site membrane; extrinsic component of membrane; phagophore assembly site; cytoplasm
Biological process	autophagy; autophagy of mitochondrion; protein lipidation; protein localization to phagophore assembly site; autophagy of nucleus; autophagosome assembly; cellular response to starvation
Sources:Amigo / QuickGO
Orthologs
Databases	NCBI: entry; OMA: entry
Species	Human	Mouse
Entrez	11152	54636
Ensembl	ENSG00000196998	ENSMUSG00000039382
UniProt	Q9Y484	Q91VM3
RefSeq (mRNA)	NM_007075; NM_001029896	NM_001290792; NM_001290794; NM_001290795; NM_172372
RefSeq (protein)	NP_001025067; NP_009006; NP_001025067.1	NP_001277721; NP_001277723; NP_001277724; NP_758960
Location (UCSC)	Chr X: 49.07 – 49.1 Mb	Chr X: 7.71 – 7.73 Mb
PubMed search
- Wikidata
View/Edit Human	View/Edit Mouse

WD repeat domain phosphoinositide-interacting protein 4 (WIPI-4) is a protein that in humans is encoded by the WDR45 gene. Mutations in this gene cause a distinct form of neurodegeneration with brain iron accumulation (NBIA) called beta-propeller protein-associated neurodegeneration (BPAN).

== Function ==
WIPI-4 is a member of the WD repeat protein family. WD repeats are minimally conserved regions of approximately 40 amino acids typically bracketed by gly-his and trp-asp (GH-WD), which may facilitate formation of heterotrimeric or multiprotein complexes. Members of this family are involved in a variety of cellular processes, including cell cycle progression, signal transduction, apoptosis, and gene regulation.

This gene WDR45 has a pseudogene at chromosome 4q31.3. Multiple alternatively spliced transcript variants encoding distinct isoforms have been found for this gene, but the biological validity and full-length nature of some variants have not been determined.

== Role in disease ==
De novo loss of function mutations in WDR45 were identified by exome sequencing in 20 patients with progressive neurodegeneration and evidence of iron on brain MRI scans. The mutations cause an X-linked dominant form of brain iron accumulation disorder now called Beta-propeller protein-associated neurodegeneration (BPAN). A name for the disease before the gene was identified was called static encephalopathy of childhood with neurodegeneration in adulthood (SENDA), though this term is no longer used.

BPAN typically causes developmental delay and epilepsy from early childhood. An unusual feature experienced by many is a tendency to overeat without feeling full. Diagnosis might be suggested by the combination of developmental delay, epilepsy, and no satiety response. A pattern of abnormality on MRI brain scans shows early swelling of the basal ganglia (globus pallidus and substantia nigra) and dentate nucleus, with later accumulation of iron in the globus pallidus and substantia nigra. Diagnosis is usually established by genetic testing.

There are no current treatments for BPAN, though medications and therapies can be used to treat symptoms.

== See also ==
- WIPI protein family
