= Sam Granick =

American biochemist

- Born: February 16, 1909; New York City
- Died: April 29, 1977 (aged 68)
- Education: University of Michigan (B.S., M.S., Ph.D.)
- Known for: Iron metabolism
- Spouse: Elsa
- Children: One daughter, one son
- Scientific career
- Fields: Biochemistry
- Institutions: Rockefeller Institute for Medical Research
- Academic advisors: Leonor Michaelis

Sam Granick (February 16, 1909 – April 29, 1977) was an American biochemist known for his studies of ferritin and iron metabolism more broadly, of chloroplast structure, and of the biosynthesis of heme and related molecules.

== Life ==
Granick was born in New York City, and earned a B.S. (1931), M.S. (1933) and Ph.D. (1938) degrees from the University of Michigan, where he completed a dissertation in plant physiology. In 1939 Granick joined the laboratory of biochemist Leonor Michaelis at the Rockefeller Institute for Medical Research; he would remain at the Rockefeller Institute for the rest of his scientific career.

== Research ==
Between 1942 and 1946, Granick and Michaelis, along with Alexandre Rothen, published a series of important research papers on ferritin and other ferric compounds in the Journal of Biological Chemistry. In the first paper, Granick showed that contrary to earlier studies purified ferritin contains no nucleic acid and varies in its content of iron and phosphorus. A second paper, by Granick and Michaelis, showed that iron could be removed from ferritin to produce apoferritin. Granick went on to study the structure of chloroplasts, a continuation of previous work, including, in 1947 with Keith R. Porter, the first application of an electron microscope to chloroplasts.

== Distinctions ==
Granick was a member of the United States National Academy of Sciences and the American Academy of Arts and Sciences.
