= Ioflupane (123I) =

Chemical compound

Ioflupane (^{123}I) INN: ioflupane

Clinical data
- Trade names: Datscan, Striascan, Celsunax
- Other names: Ioflupane (FPCIT); [I-123] N-ω-fluoropropyl- 2β-carbomethoxy- 3β-(4-iodophenyl) nortropane
- AHFS/Drugs.com: Professional Drug Facts
- License data: US DailyMed: Ioflupane
- Routes of administration: Intravenous
- ATC code: V09AB03 (WHO)

Legal status
- Legal status: CA: ℞-only; US: ℞-only; EU: Rx-only

Pharmacokinetic data
- Bioavailability: N/A
- Excretion: Kidney and fecal

Identifiers
- IUPAC name: methyl (1R,2S,3S,5S)- 3-(4-iodophenyl)- 8-(3-fluoropropyl)- 8-azabicyclo[3.2.1]octane- 2-carboxylate
- CAS Number: 155798-07-5
- PubChem CID: 3086674
- IUPHAR/BPS: 7653
- DrugBank: DB08824
- ChemSpider: 2343241
- UNII: 3MM99T8R5Q
- KEGG: D10014
- ChEBI: CHEBI:68855
- ChEMBL: ChEMBL3989517
- CompTox Dashboard (EPA): DTXSID90935291

Chemical and physical data
- Formula: C_{18}H_{23}FINO_{2}
- Molar mass: 431.290 g·mol^{−1}
- 3D model (JSmol): Interactive image
- SMILES: COC(=O)[C@@H]1[C@H]2CCC(N2CCCF)C[C@@H]1C3=CC=C(C=C3)[123I]
- InChI: InChI=1S/C18H23FINO2/c1-23-18(22)17-15(12-3-5-13(20)6-4-12)11-14-7-8-16(17)21(14)10-2-9-19/h3-6,14-17H,2,7-11H2,1H3/t14-,15+,16+,17-/m0/s1/i20-4; Key:HXWLAJVUJSVENX-HFIFKADTSA-N

Ioflupane (^{123}I) is the international nonproprietary name (INN) of a cocaine analogue which is a neuro-imaging radiopharmaceutical drug, used in nuclear medicine for the diagnosis of Parkinson's disease and the differential diagnosis of Parkinson's disease over other disorders presenting similar symptoms. During the DaT scan procedure it is injected into a patient and viewed with a gamma camera in order to acquire SPECT images of the brain with particular respect to the striatum, a subcortical region of the basal ganglia. The drug is sold under the brand name Datscan and is manufactured by GE Healthcare, formerly Amersham plc.

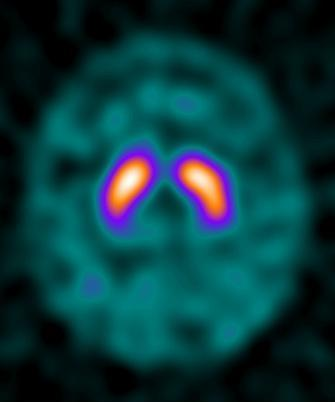
SPECT DaTSCAN showing normal Ioflupane (^{123}I) uptake in the striatum.

== Pharmacology ==
Datscan is a solution of ioflupane (^{123}I) for injection into a living test subject.

The iodine introduced during manufacture is a radioactive isotope, iodine-123, and it is the gamma decay of this isotope that is detectable to a gamma camera. ^{123}I has a half-life of approximately 13 hours and a gamma photon energy of 159 keV making it an appropriate radionuclide for medical imaging. The solution also contains 5% ethanol to aid solubility and is supplied sterile since it is intended for intravenous use.

Ioflupane has a high binding affinity for presynaptic dopamine transporters (DAT) in the brains of mammals, in particular the striatal region of the brain. A feature of Parkinson's disease is a marked reduction in dopaminergic neurons in the striatal region. By introducing an agent that binds to the dopamine transporters a quantitative measure and spatial distribution of the transporters can be obtained.

== Method of administration ==
The Datscan solution is supplied ready to inject with a certificate stating the calibration activity and time. The nominal injection activity is 185 MBq and a scan should not be performed with less than 111 MBq.

Thyroid blocking via oral administration of 120 mg potassium iodide is recommended to minimize unnecessary excessive uptake of radioiodine. This is typically given 1–4 hours before the injection.

The most convenient way to administer the IV dose is via a peripheral intravenous cannula. The scan is carried out 3 to 6 hours post injection.

== Pharmacokinetics ==
Blood clearance of the radionuclide is rapid in healthy volunteers. Radioactivity was 4.5% of the injected amount 5 min after injection of ioflupane (^{123}I), falling to 2.2% at 30 min, 1.9% at 5 h, and declining to 1.3% at 24 h and 1.1% at 48 h after injection. Values were similar in both whole blood and plasma. Excretion was primarily renal.

== Risks ==
Common side effects of ioflupane (^{123}I) are headache, vertigo, increased appetite and formication. Less than 1% of patients experience pain at the injection site.

The radiation risks are reported as low. The committed effective dose for a single investigation on a 70 kg individual is 4.6 mSv. Pregnant patients should not undergo the test. It is not known if ^{123}I-ioflupane is secreted in breast milk however it is recommended that breastfeeding be interrupted for three days after administration.

== See also ==
- List of cocaine analogues
