= Mitochondrial membrane protein-associated neurodegeneration =

Genetic neurodegenerative disease with brain iron accumulation

- Other names: Neurodegeneration with brain iron accumulation 4
- Specialty: Neurology
- Symptoms: Dystonia, parkinsonism, dementia
- Types: Recessive, dominant
- Causes: C19orf12 mutation
- Frequency: 1/1,000,000

Mitochondrial membrane protein-associated neurodegeneration (MPAN) is a genetic neurodegenerative disease that causes dystonia, parkinsonism, and iron accumulation in the brain. It is caused by mutations to the gene C19orf12, which has unknown function. This was originally discovered as an autosomal recessive disorder, caused by individuals having two mutations to the gene C19orf12, but autosomal dominant disease caused by a single mutation in the same gene has also been rarely described. Due to the common features of neurodegeneration, brain iron accumulation, and movement disorder it is classified as a neurodegeneration with brain iron accumulation (NBIA) disorder and another name for the condition is neurodegeneration with brain iron accumulation 4 (NBIA4).

== Signs and symptoms ==
Symptoms typically begin in childhood and worsen over time. Typical initial features include difficulty walking and dystonia, with later progression to difficulty moving called parkinsonism. Associated problems can include optic nerve atrophy. As movement difficulties worsen, it can cause difficulty swallowing (dysphagia), difficulty speaking (dysarthria), and dementia.

== Genetics ==
C19orf12

Identifiers
- Aliases: C19orf12, NBIA3, NBIA4, SPG43, chromosome 19 open reading frame 12, MPAN
- External IDs: OMIM: 614297; MGI: 1919494; GeneCards: C19orf12

Gene location (Human)
Chr.	Chromosome 19 (human)
Band	19q12	Start	29,698,937 bp
Band	19q12	End	29,715,789 bp

Gene location (Mouse)
Chr.	Chromosome 7 (mouse)
Band	7|7 B3	Start	37,882,642 bp
Band	7|7 B3	End	37,896,992 bp
RNA expression pattern
Bgee	Human / Mouse (ortholog); Top expressed in: endothelial cell; pancreatic epithelial cell; Brodmann area 23; Skeletal muscle tissue of biceps brachii; myocardium of left ventricle; middle temporal gyrus; deltoid muscle; pancreatic ductal cell; muscle of thigh; tibialis anterior muscle / Top expressed in: transitional epithelium of urinary bladder; left lobe of liver; granulocyte; cornea; brown adipose tissue; right ventricle; subcutaneous adipose tissue; white adipose tissue; sternocleidomastoid muscle; right kidney; More reference expression data
BioGPS	n/a
Orthologs
Databases	NCBI: entry; OMA: entry
Species	Human	Mouse
Entrez	83636	72244
Ensembl	ENSG00000131943	ENSMUSG00000054676
UniProt	Q9NSK7	Q8WUR0
RefSeq (mRNA)	NM_031448; NM_001031726; NM_001256046; NM_001256047; NM_001282929 NM_001282930; NM_001282931	NM_001085385; NM_028166
RefSeq (protein)	NP_001026896; NP_001242975; NP_001242976; NP_001269858; NP_001269859 NP_001269860; NP_113636	NP_001078854; NP_082442
Location (UCSC)	Chr 19: 29.7 – 29.72 Mb	Chr 7: 37.88 – 37.9 Mb
PubMed search
- Wikidata
View/Edit Human	View/Edit Mouse

MPAN is caused by variants to a single gene, C19orf12, the function of which is not currently known. The more common form is caused by an individual having two dysfunctional copies of C19orf12 which are typically inherited from unaffected parents carrying one mutated copy and one normal copy (carrier status). This is called autosomal recessive inheritance. More rarely described are individuals with a single dysfunctional copy of C19orf12 causing disease, considered to be an autosomal dominant form of the disease that can either be inherited or arise from a de novo mutation.

The protein C19orf12 is not well understood, it is expressed in most cells and is thought to localize to mitochondria and the endoplasmic reticulum.

== Diagnosis ==
MPAN might be suspected with typical presentation and findings on MRI (Magnetic Resonance Imaging), these include evidence of iron deposition in the brain, particularly in the basal ganglia (globus pallidus and substantia nigra). The diagnosis is confirmed by genetic testing identifying harmful variant(s) in C19orf12.

=== Neuropathology ===
Pathological findings in brains of people with MPAN include iron deposition and scarring in the globus pallidus, loss of neurons in the substantia nigra, and widespread Lewy bodies and spherical bodies from degenerating neurons.

== Management ==
There are no current treatments or clinical trials for MPAN, so medical treatment focusses on relief of symptoms such as spasticity and dystonia using medications (such as gabapentin, trihexyphenidyl or baclofen), or surgery.

== Prognosis ==
MPAN typically progresses more slowly than other NBIA disorders, and people usually survive into adulthood. As it progresses, people have more difficulty with cognition, speaking, swallowing, movement difficulties, and neuropsychiatric problems.

== Epidemiology ==
Prevalence data regarding this disorder remains incomplete, however it is estimated that less than 1 in 1,000,000 have the disease worldwide. It is more common in Turkish people, due to a founder mutation.

== History ==
MPAN was first described in 2011 in 24 Polish patients with mutations in C19orf12, later confirmed in a further 23 people.
