= DCAF17 =

Protein-coding gene in the species Homo sapiens

Identifiers
- Aliases: DCAF17, C2orf37, DDB1 and CUL4 associated factor 17, C20orf37
- External IDs: OMIM: 612515; MGI: 1923013; HomoloGene: 65979; GeneCards: DCAF17; OMA:DCAF17 - orthologs

Gene location (Human)
Chr.	Chromosome 2 (human)
Band	2q31.1	Start	171,434,217 bp
Band	2q31.1	End	171,485,052 bp

Gene location (Mouse)
Chr.	Chromosome 2 (mouse)
Band	2|2 C2	Start	71,055,328 bp
Band	2|2 C2	End	71,099,142 bp
RNA expression pattern
Bgee	Human / Mouse (ortholog); Top expressed in: testicle; secondary oocyte; Achilles tendon; ganglionic eminence; body of uterus; gonad; right lobe of thyroid gland; ventricular zone; left lobe of thyroid gland; left ovary / Top expressed in: otic vesicle; hand; epithelium of lens; Rostral migratory stream; spermatocyte; tail of embryo; secondary oocyte; spermatid; genital tubercle; epithelium of small intestine; More reference expression data
BioGPS	n/a
Gene ontology
Molecular function	protein binding
Cellular component	integral component of membrane; Cul4-RING E3 ubiquitin ligase complex; nucleolus; membrane; nucleus; cytosol; nucleoplasm
Biological process	post-translational protein modification; protein ubiquitination
Sources:Amigo / QuickGO
Orthologs
Species	Human	Mouse
Entrez	80067	75763
Ensembl	ENSG00000115827	ENSMUSG00000041966
UniProt	Q5H9S7	Q3TUL7
RefSeq (mRNA)	NM_001164821; NM_025000	NM_001165980; NM_001165981; NM_001165982; NM_198005
RefSeq (protein)	NP_001158293; NP_079276	NP_001159452; NP_001159453; NP_001159454; NP_932122
Location (UCSC)	Chr 2: 171.43 – 171.49 Mb	Chr 2: 71.06 – 71.1 Mb
PubMed search
- Wikidata
View/Edit Human	View/Edit Mouse

DDB1 and CUL4 associated factor 17 is a protein that in humans is encoded buy the DCAF17 gene.

== Function ==
DCAF17 is a nuclear transmembrane protein that associates with cullin 4A / damaged DNA binding protein 1 ubiquitin ligase complex.

== Clinical significance ==
Mutations in this gene are associated with Woodhouse–Sakati syndrome.
