= DaT scan =

Diagnostic method

- [edit on Wikidata]

Striatum

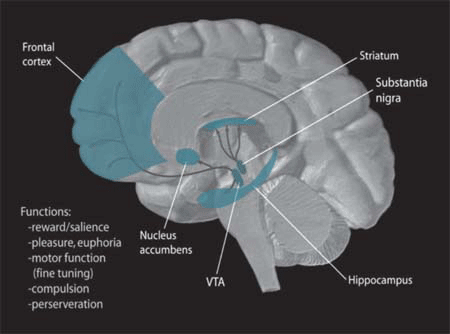
Dopamine Pathways

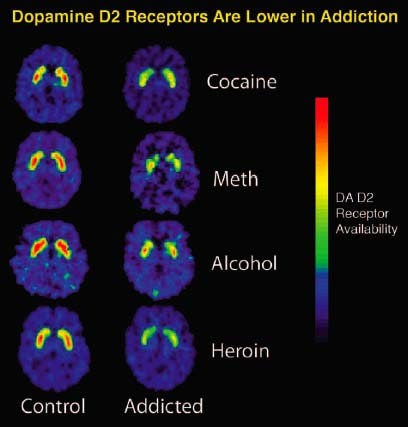
Dopamine D2 receptors

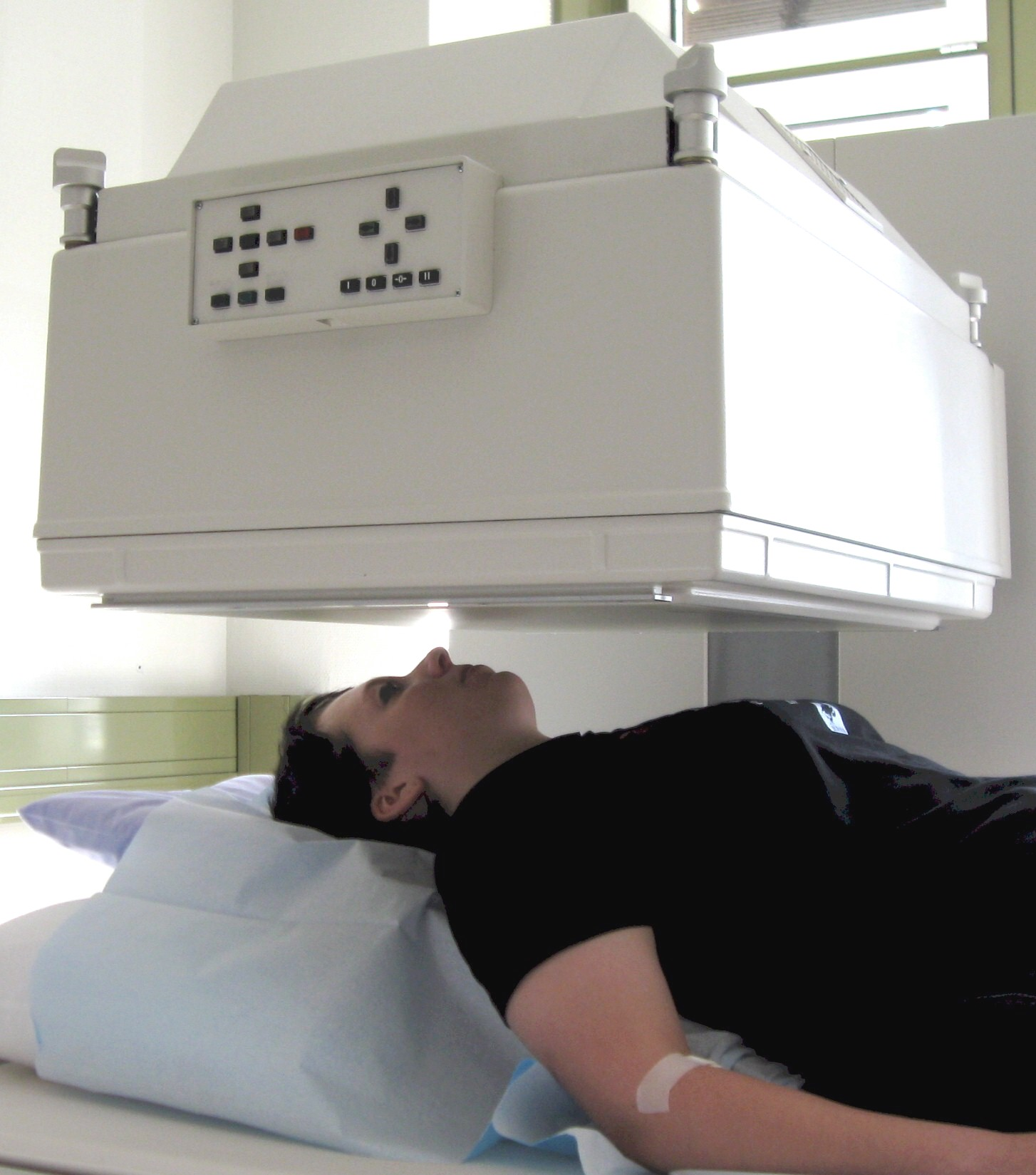
Gamma-camera

DaT Scan (DaT scan or Dopamine Transporter Scan) commonly refers to a diagnostic method, based on SPECT imaging, to investigate if there is a loss of dopaminergic neurons in striatum. The term may also refer to a brand name of Ioflupane (123I) tracer used for the study. The scan principle is based on use of the radiopharmaceutical Ioflupane (123I) which binds to dopamine transporters (DaT). The signal from them is then detected by the use of single-photon emission computed tomography (SPECT) which uses special gamma-cameras to create a pictographic representation of the distribution of dopamine transporters in the brain.

DaTSCAN is indicated in cases of tremor when its origin is uncertain. Although this method can distinguish essential tremor from Parkinson's syndrome, it is unable to distinguish between Parkinson's disease, Dementia with Lewy bodies, Parkinson's disease dementia, multiple system atrophy or progressive supranuclear palsy.

There is evidence that DaTSCAN is accurate in diagnosing early Parkinson's.

== Procedure ==
A patient takes two iodine tablets and waits for one hour. These pills are important because they prevent the accumulation of radioactive substances in the thyroid gland. After one hour, the patient gets an injection to the vein, which contains the radiopharmaceutical, and then waits for 4 hours. The concentration of the substance increases, and then it is scanned by a gamma-camera, which is positioned around the patient's head. The imaging portion lasts about 30–45 minutes, and it is non-invasive.

If a patient uses certain medications listed below, it is necessary to stop usage for a few days or weeks before the DaTSCAN, but only after a consultation with the patient's doctor.

The examination takes just a few hours, so patients do not need to stay in a hospital overnight, but they have to drink much more than they are used to and go to the toilet more often. It is important for a fast elimination of the radioactive substances from the body.

== Contraindications ==
- pregnancy
- breast-feeding
- severe renal or hepatic insufficiency
- certain medications – stimulants or noradrenalin and some antidepressants

== Differential Diagnosis ==
- Parkinson's disease, multiple system atrophy or progressive supranuclear palsy
- Essential tremor
- Lewy body disease
