= WIPI1 =

Protein-coding gene in the species Homo sapiens

Identifiers
- Aliases: WIPI1, ATG18, ATG18A, WIPI49, WD repeat domain, phosphoinositide interacting 1
- External IDs: OMIM: 609224; MGI: 1261864; GeneCards: WIPI1

Gene location (Human)
Chr.	Chromosome 17 (human)
Band	17q24.2	Start	68,420,948 bp
Band	17q24.2	End	68,457,513 bp

Gene location (Mouse)
Chr.	Chromosome 11 (mouse)
Band	11 E1|11 72.18 cM	Start	109,464,157 bp
Band	11 E1|11 72.18 cM	End	109,502,793 bp
RNA expression pattern
Bgee	Human / Mouse (ortholog); Top expressed in: stromal cell of endometrium; sperm; gastrocnemius muscle; minor salivary glands; muscle of thigh; biceps brachii; left ventricle; skeletal muscle tissue; sural nerve; olfactory zone of nasal mucosa / Top expressed in: seminal vesicula; interventricular septum; saccule; retinal pigment epithelium; muscle of thigh; right ventricle; stroma of bone marrow; submandibular gland; otic vesicle; granulocyte; More reference expression data
BioGPS	n/a
Gene ontology
Molecular function	phosphatidylinositol-3-phosphate binding; phosphatidylinositol-3,5-bisphosphate binding; androgen receptor binding; signaling receptor binding; estrogen receptor binding; protein binding; lipid binding
Cellular component	cytoplasm; phagophore assembly site membrane; endosome; Golgi apparatus; membrane; Golgi membrane; trans-Golgi network; autophagosome membrane; endosome membrane; cytoskeleton; cytoplasmic vesicle; clathrin-coated vesicle; phagophore assembly site; cytosol; extrinsic component of membrane
Biological process	vesicle targeting, trans-Golgi to endosome; autophagy; IRE1-mediated unfolded protein response; macroautophagy; autophagy of mitochondrion; protein lipidation; protein localization to phagophore assembly site; autophagy of nucleus; autophagosome assembly; cellular response to starvation
Sources:Amigo / QuickGO
Orthologs
Databases	NCBI: entry; OMA: entry
Species	Human	Mouse
Entrez	55062	52639
Ensembl	ENSG00000070540	ENSMUSG00000041895
UniProt	Q5MNZ9	Q8R3E3
RefSeq (mRNA)	NM_017983; NM_001320772	NM_145940
RefSeq (protein)	NP_001307701; NP_060453	NP_666052
Location (UCSC)	Chr 17: 68.42 – 68.46 Mb	Chr 11: 109.46 – 109.5 Mb
PubMed search
- Wikidata
View/Edit Human	View/Edit Mouse

WD repeat domain phosphoinositide-interacting protein 1 (WIPI-1), also known as Atg18 protein homolog (ATG18) and WD40 repeat protein interacting with phosphoinositides of 49 kDa (WIPI 49 kDa), is a protein that in humans is encoded by the WIPI1 gene.

== Structure and function ==
WD40 repeat proteins are key components of many essential biologic functions. They regulate the assembly of multiprotein complexes by presenting a beta-propeller platform for simultaneous and reversible protein–protein interactions. Members of the WIPI subfamily of WD40 repeat proteins, such as WIPI1, have a 7-bladed propeller structure and contain a conserved motif for interaction with phospholipids.

== See also ==
- WIPI protein family
