= Ferritin light chain =

Protein found in humans

FTL
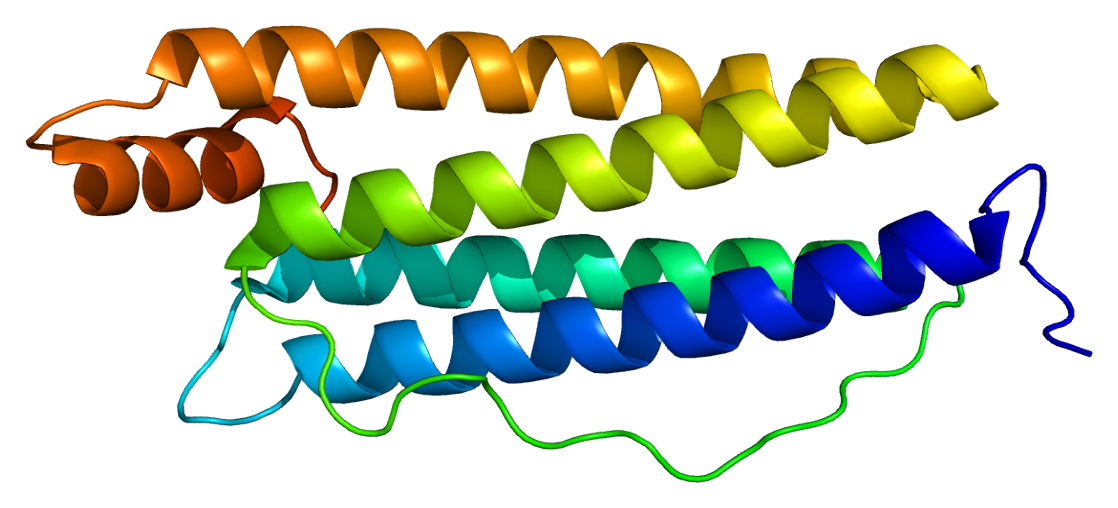

Identifiers
- Aliases: FTL, LFTD, NBIA3, ferritin, light polypeptide, ferritin light chain
- External IDs: OMIM: 134790; MGI: 5434102; GeneCards: FTL
Available structures
PDB	Human UniProt search: PDBe RCSB
PDB	List of PDB id codes 2FFX, 2FG4, 2FG8, 3KXU

Gene location (Human)
Chr.	Chromosome 19 (human)
Band	19q13.33	Start	48,965,309 bp
Band	19q13.33	End	48,966,879 bp
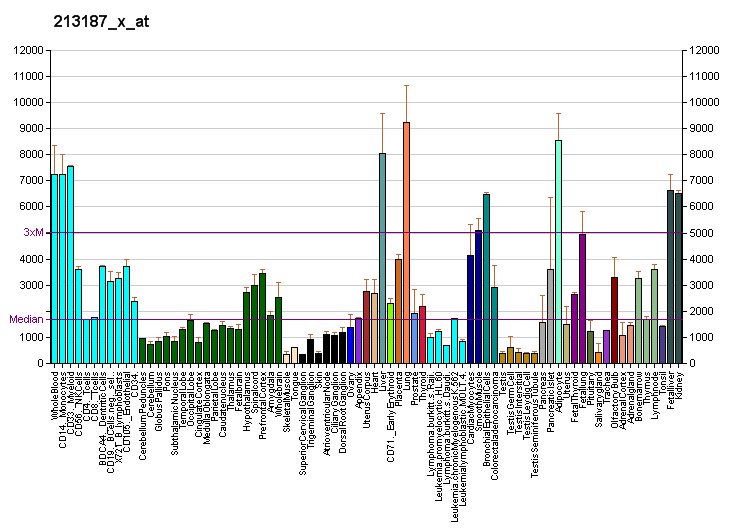

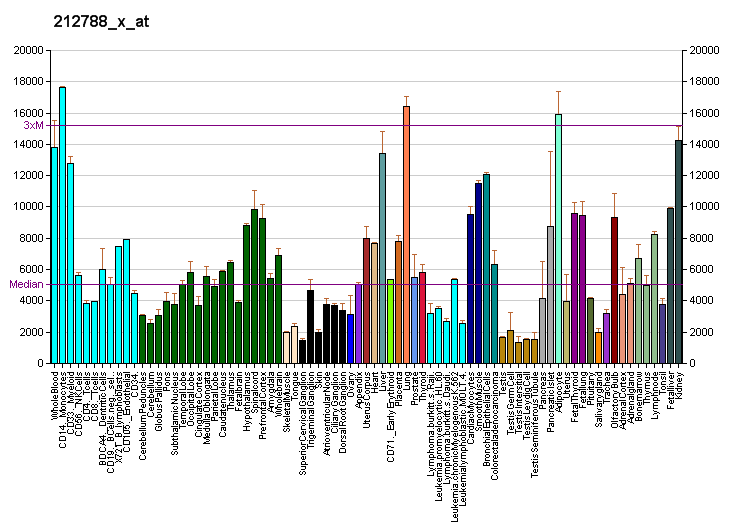
RNA expression pattern
Bgee	Human / Mouse (ortholog); Top expressed in: stromal cell of endometrium; blood; gallbladder; upper lobe of left lung; right lung; islet of Langerhans; subcutaneous adipose tissue; spleen; monocyte; Descending thoracic aorta / n/a; More reference expression data
BioGPS	More reference expression data
Gene ontology
Molecular function	iron ion binding; protein binding; ferric iron binding; metal ion binding; identical protein binding; ferroxidase activity; ferrous iron binding
Cellular component	cytosol; extracellular exosome; intracellular ferritin complex; membrane; extracellular region; azurophil granule lumen; autolysosome; cytoplasm
Biological process	iron ion homeostasis; iron ion transport; cellular iron ion homeostasis; intracellular sequestering of iron ion; neutrophil degranulation
Sources:Amigo / QuickGO
Orthologs
Databases	NCBI: entry; OMA: entry
Species	Human	Mouse
Entrez	2512	434624
Ensembl	ENSG00000087086	n/a
UniProt	P02792	n/a
RefSeq (mRNA)	NM_000146	n/a
RefSeq (protein)	NP_000137	n/a
Location (UCSC)	Chr 19: 48.97 – 48.97 Mb	n/a
PubMed search
- Wikidata
View/Edit Human	View/Edit Mouse

Ferritin light chain is a protein that in humans is encoded by the FTL gene. Ferritin is the major protein responsible for storing intracellular iron in prokaryotes and eukaryotes. It is a heteropolymer consisting of 24 subunits, heavy and light ferritin chains. This gene has multiple pseudogenes.

It is abnormally expressed in fetuses of both IVF and ICSI, which may contribute to the increased risk of birth defects in these assisted reproductive technologies.

== Function ==
Iron is extremely important in the development of neurons, transport through iron-sulfur clusters, the electron transport chain, and synthesis and breakdown of neurotransmitters. The function of the FTL is to act as both an iron reservoir and to remove excess iron from the body. Since iron plays a role in electron transfer, there is potential for the generation of free, highly toxic radicals which makes the role of the FTL as an iron detoxifier very significant. The rates of iron uptake and release may be affected by changes to the components of the ferritin light chains and heavy chains. Although the ferritin light chain unlike the ferritin heavy chain has no ferroxidase activity, the light chain may be responsible for the electron transfer across the ferritin protein cage.

== Clinical significance ==
Oxidative stress caused by iron radicals generated in the ETC and an increase in iron levels caused by defects in the FTL gene has been known to be a cause of the onset of neurodegenerative diseases and hyperferritinemia-cataract syndrome. Elevated levels of FTL1 may be associated with age-related cognitive decline.

Mutations of the FTL gene cause the rare adult-onset basal ganglia disease also known as neuroferritinopathy. These mutations are specifically in exon four of the FTL gene. There are two distinct toxic mechanisms that lead to neuroferritinopathy and these are abnormalities in iron metabolism and the creation of free iron radicals, resulting in oxidative stress and cell death.

== Interactions ==
Ferritin light chain has been shown to interact with FTH1. An oxygen molecule acts as the terminal electron acceptor during the oxidation of iron in aerobic metabolism. A study conducted with different apoferritins with distinct compositions of heavy and light subunits revealed that both subunits have key roles in the electron transport chain. Neither subunit on its own has the ability to reduce cytochrome c and thus the first step, the oxidation of Fe^{2+} to Fe^{3+}, can be carried out by the heavy chain and the light chains are responsible for the transfer of electrons.

FTL is regulated by iron and with an increase in iron, there is both an increase in the FTL expression and PEN-2 levels, which results in increased γ- secretase activity. In relation to this, the downregulation of FTL expression leads to a decrease in the protein levels of PEN-2.

== See also ==
- Ferritin
