= Ferritin =

Iron-carrying protein

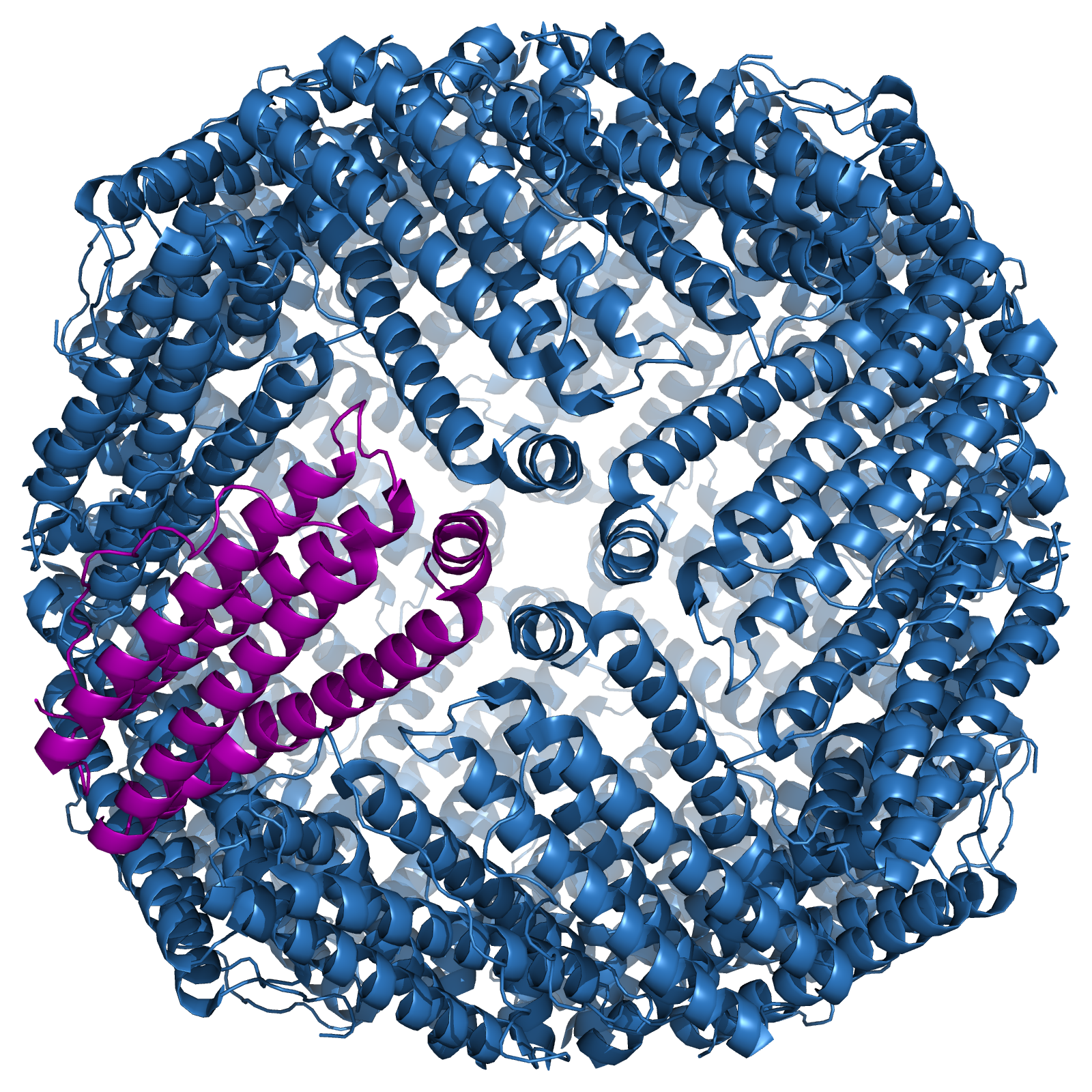
- Structure of the murine ferritin complex

Identifiers
- Symbol: Ferritin
- Pfam: PF00210
- Pfam clan: CL0044
- InterPro: IPR008331
- SCOP2: 1fha / SCOPe / SUPFAM
Available protein structures:
- PDB: IPR008331 PF00210 (ECOD; PDBsum)
- AlphaFold: IPR008331; PF00210

ferritin, light polypeptide

Identifiers
- Symbol: FTL
- NCBI gene: 2512
- HGNC: 3999
- OMIM: 134790
- RefSeq: NM_000146
- UniProt: P02792

Other data
- Locus: Chr. 19 q13.3–13.4
Search for
- Structures: Swiss-model
- Domains: InterPro

ferritin, heavy polypeptide 1

Identifiers
- Symbol: FTH1
- Alt. symbols: FTHL6
- NCBI gene: 2495
- HGNC: 3976
- OMIM: 134770
- RefSeq: NM_002032
- UniProt: P02794

Other data
- Locus: Chr. 11 q13
Search for
- Structures: Swiss-model
- Domains: InterPro

ferritin mitochondrial
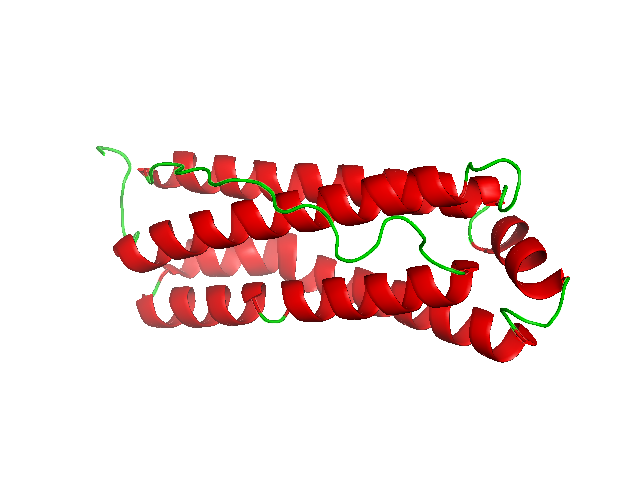
- Crystallographic structure of mitochondrial ferritin.

Identifiers
- Symbol: FTMT
- NCBI gene: 94033
- HGNC: 17345
- OMIM: 608847
- RefSeq: NM_177478
- UniProt: Q8N4E7

Other data
- Locus: Chr. 5 q23.1
Search for
- Structures: Swiss-model
- Domains: InterPro

Ferritin is a universal intracellular and extracellular protein that stores iron and releases it in a controlled fashion. The protein is produced by almost all living organisms, including archaea, bacteria, algae, higher plants, and animals. It is the primary intracellular iron-storage protein in both prokaryotes and eukaryotes, keeping iron in a soluble and non-toxic form. In humans, it acts as a buffer against iron deficiency and iron overload.

Ferritin is found in most tissues as a cytosolic protein, but small amounts are secreted into the serum where it functions as an iron carrier. Plasma ferritin is also an indirect marker of the total amount of iron stored in the body; hence, serum ferritin is used as a diagnostic test for iron-deficiency anemia and iron overload. Aggregated ferritin transforms into a water-insoluble, crystalline and amorphous form of storage iron called hemosiderin.

Ferritin is a globular protein complex consisting of 24 protein subunits forming a hollow spherical nanocage with multiple metal–protein interactions. Ferritin with iron removed is called apoferritin.

== Gene ==
Ferritin genes are highly conserved between species. All vertebrate ferritin genes have three introns and four exons. In human ferritin, introns are present between amino acid residues 14 and 15, 34 and 35, and 82 and 83; in addition, there are one to two hundred untranslated bases at either end of the combined exons. The tyrosine residue at amino acid position 27 is thought to be associated with biomineralization.

== Protein structure ==
Ferritin is a hollow globular protein of mass 474 kDa and comprising 24 subunits. Typically it has internal and external diameters of about 8 and 12 nm, respectively. The nature of these subunits varies by class of organism:

- In vertebrates, the subunits are of two types, light (L) and heavy (H), which have apparent molecular mass of 19 kDa and 21 kDa, respectively; their sequences are homologous (about 50% identical).
- Amphibians have an additional ("M") type of ferritin.
- Plants and bacteria have a single ferritin; it most closely resembles the vertebrate H-type.
- In the gastropods of the genus Lymnaea, two types have been recovered, from somatic cells and the yolk, respectively (see below).
- In the pearl oyster Pinctada fucata, an additional subunit resembling Lymnaea soma ferritin is associated with shell formation.
- In the parasite Schistosoma, two types are present: one in males, the other in females.

All the aforementioned ferritins are similar, in terms of their primary sequence, with the vertebrate H-type. In E. coli, a 20% similarity to human H-ferritin is observed. Some ferritin complexes in vertebrates are hetero-oligomers of two highly related gene products with slightly different physiological properties. The ratio of the two homologous proteins in the complex depends on the relative expression levels of the two genes.

Cytosolic ferritin shell (apoferritin) is a heteropolymer of 24 subunits of heavy (H) and light (L) peptides that form a hollow spherical nanocage that covers an iron core composed of crystallites together with phosphate and hydroxide ions. The resulting particle is similar to ferrihydrite (5Fe_{2}O_{3}·9H_{2}O). Each ferritin complex can store about 4500 iron (Fe^{3+}) ions. The proportion of H to L subunits varies in ferritin from different tissues, explaining its heterogeneity on isoelectric focusing. L-rich ferritins (from spleen and liver) are more basic than H-rich ferritins (from heart and red blood cells).

Serum ferritin, which is typically iron-poor, consists almost exclusively of L subunits. Serum ferritin is heterogeneous due to glycosylation. The glycosylation and direct relationship of serum ferritin concentration to iron storage in macrophages suggest it is secreted by macrophages in response to changing iron levels.

Human mitochondrial ferritin, MtF, was found to express as a pro-protein. When a mitochondrion takes it up, it processes it into a mature protein similar to the ferritins found in the cytoplasm, which it assembles to form functional ferritin shells. Unlike other human ferritins, it is a homopolymer of H type ferritin and appears to have no introns (intronless) in its genetic code. The mitochondrial ferritin's Ramachandran plot shows its structure to be mainly alpha helical with a low prevalence of beta sheets. It accumulates in large amounts in the erythroblasts of subjects with impaired heme synthesis.

The 24 subunits occupy the vertices of a snub cube or the faces of a pentagonal icositetrahedron.

== Function ==
=== Iron storage ===
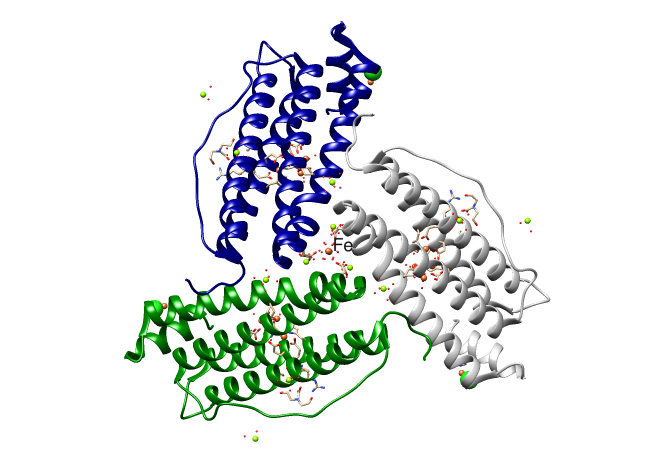
Iron uptake through the 3-fold channel of ferritin

Ferritin is present in every cell type. It serves to store iron in a non-toxic form, to deposit it in a safe form, and to transport it to areas where it is required. The function and structure of the expressed ferritin protein varies in different cell types. This is controlled primarily by the amount and stability of messenger RNA (mRNA), but also by changes in how the mRNA is stored and how efficiently it is transcribed. One major trigger for the production of many ferritins is the mere presence of iron; an exception is the yolk ferritin of Lymnaea sp., which lacks an iron-responsive unit.

Free iron is toxic to cells as it acts as a catalyst in the formation of free radicals from reactive oxygen species via the Fenton reaction. Hence vertebrates have an elaborate set of protective mechanisms to bind iron in various tissue compartments. Within cells, iron is stored in a protein complex as ferritin or the related complex hemosiderin. Apoferritin binds to free ferrous iron and stores it in the ferric state. As ferritin accumulates within cells of the reticuloendothelial system, protein aggregates are formed as hemosiderin. Iron in ferritin or hemosiderin can be extracted for release by the RE cells, although hemosiderin is less readily available. Under steady-state conditions, the level of ferritin in the blood serum correlates with total body stores of iron; thus, the serum ferritin FR5Rl is the most convenient laboratory test to estimate iron stores.

Because iron is an important mineral in mineralization, ferritin is employed in the shells of organisms such as molluscs to control the concentration and distribution of iron, thus sculpting shell morphology and colouration. It also plays a role in the haemolymph of the polyplacophora, where it serves to rapidly transport iron to the mineralizing radula.

Iron is released from ferritin for use by ferritin degradation, which is performed mainly by lysosomes.

=== Ferroxidase activity ===
Vertebrate ferritin consists of two or three subunits which are named based on their molecular weight: L "light", H "heavy", and M "middle" subunits. The M subunit has only been reported in bullfrogs. In bacteria and archaea, ferritin consists of one subunit type. H and M subunits of eukaryotic ferritin and all subunits of bacterial and archaeal ferritin are H-type and have ferroxidase activity, which means they are able to convert iron from the ferrous (Fe^{2+}) to ferric (Fe^{3+}) forms. This limits the deleterious reaction which occurs between ferrous iron and hydrogen peroxide known as the Fenton reaction which produces the highly damaging hydroxyl radical. The ferroxidase activity occurs at a diiron binding site in the middle of each H-type subunits. After oxidation of Fe(II), the Fe(III) product stays metastably in the ferroxidase center and is displaced by Fe(II), a mechanism that appears to be common among ferritins of all domains of life. The light chain of ferritin has no ferroxidase activity but may be responsible for the electron transfer across the protein cage.

=== Immune response ===
Ferritin concentrations increase drastically in the presence of an infection or cancer. Endotoxins are an up-regulator of the gene coding for ferritin, thus causing the concentration of ferritin to rise. By contrast, organisms such as Pseudomonas, although possessing endotoxin, cause plasma ferritin levels to drop significantly within the first 48 hours of infection. Thus, the iron stores of the infected body are denied to the infective agent, impeding its metabolism.

=== Stress response ===
The concentration of ferritin has been shown to increase in response to stresses such as anoxia, which implies that it is an acute phase protein.

=== Mitochondria ===
Mitochondrial ferritin has many roles pertaining to molecular function. It participates in ferroxidase activity and iron ion binding. Within the realm of biological processes it participates in oxidation-reduction, iron ion transport across membranes and cellular iron ion homeostasis.

=== Yolk ===
In some snails, the protein component of the egg yolk is primarily ferritin. This is a different ferritin, with a different genetic sequence, from the somatic ferritin. It is produced in the midgut glands and secreted into the haemolymph, whence it is transported to the eggs.

== Tissue distribution ==
In vertebrates, ferritin is usually found within cells, although it is also present in smaller quantities in the plasma.

== Diagnostic uses ==
Serum ferritin levels are measured in medical laboratories as part of the iron studies workup for iron-deficiency anemia. They are measured in nanograms per milliliter (ng/mL) or micrograms per liter (μg/L); the two units are equivalent.

The ferritin levels measured usually have a direct correlation with the total amount of iron stored in the body. However, ferritin levels may be artificially high in cases of anemia of chronic disease, where ferritin is elevated in its capacity as an inflammatory acute phase protein and not as a marker for iron overload.

=== Normal ranges ===
A normal ferritin blood level, referred to as the reference interval is determined by many testing laboratories. The ranges for ferritin can vary between laboratories but typical ranges would be between 40 and 300 ng/mL (=μg/L) for males, and 20–200 ng/mL (=μg/L) for females.

Normal ferritin blood levels according to sex and age
Adult males	40–300 ng/mL (μg/L)
Adult females	20–200 ng/mL (μg/L)
Children (6 months to 15 years)	50–140 ng/mL (μg/L)
Infants (1 to 5 months)	50–200 ng/mL (μg/L)
Neonates	25–200 ng/mL (μg/L)

=== Deficiency ===
According to a 2014 review in the New England Journal of Medicine, a ferritin level below 30 ng/mL indicates iron deficiency, while a level below 10 ng/mL indicates iron-deficiency anemia. A 2020 World Health Organization guideline states that ferritin indicates iron deficiency below 12 ng/mL in apparently-healthy children under 5 and 15 ng/mL in apparently-healthy individuals of 5 and over.

Some studies suggest that women with fatigue and ferritin below 50 ng/mL see reduced fatigue after iron supplementation.

In the setting of anemia, low serum ferritin is the most specific lab finding for iron-deficiency anemia. However it is less sensitive, since its levels are increased in the blood by infection or any type of chronic inflammation, and these conditions may convert what would otherwise be a low level of ferritin from lack of iron, into a value in the normal range. For this reason, low ferritin levels carry more information than those in the normal range. A falsely low blood ferritin (equivalent to a false positive test) is very uncommon, but can result from a hook effect of the measuring tools in extreme cases.

Low ferritin may also indicate hypothyroidism, vitamin C deficiency or celiac disease.

Low serum ferritin levels are seen in some patients with restless legs syndrome, not necessarily related to anemia, but perhaps due to low iron stores short of anemia.

Vegetarianism is not a cause of low serum ferritin levels, according to the American Dietetic Association's position in 2009: "Incidence of iron-deficiency anemia among vegetarians is similar to that of non-vegetarians. Although vegetarian adults have lower iron stores than non-vegetarians, their serum ferritin levels are usually within the normal range."

=== Excess ===
If ferritin is high, there is iron in excess or else there is an acute inflammatory reaction in which ferritin is mobilized without iron excess. For example, ferritins may be high in infection without signaling body iron overload.

Ferritin is also used as a marker for iron overload disorders, such as hemochromatosis or hemosiderosis. Adult-onset Still's disease, some porphyrias, and hemophagocytic lymphohistiocytosis/macrophage activation syndrome are diseases in which the ferritin level may be abnormally raised.

As ferritin is also an acute-phase reactant, it is often elevated in the course of disease. A normal C-reactive protein can be used to exclude elevated ferritin caused by acute phase reactions.

Ferritin has been shown to be elevated in some cases of COVID-19 and may correlate with worse clinical outcome. Ferritin and IL-6 are considered to be possible immunological biomarkers for severe and fatal cases of COVID-19. Ferritin and C-reactive protein may be possible screening tools for early diagnosis of systemic inflammatory response syndrome in cases of COVID-19.

According to a study of anorexia nervosa patients, ferritin can be elevated during periods of acute malnourishment, perhaps due to iron going into storage as intravascular volume and thus the number of red blood cells falls.

Another study suggests that due to the catabolic nature of anorexia nervosa, isoferritins may be released. Furthermore, ferritin has significant non-storage roles within the body, such as protection from oxidative damage. The rise of these isoferritins may contribute to an overall increase in ferritin concentration. The measurement of ferritin through immunoassay or immunoturbidimetric methods may also be picking up these isoferritins thus not a true reflection of iron storage status.

Studies reveal that a transferrin saturation (serum iron concentration ÷ total iron binding capacity) over 60 percent in men and over 50 percent in women identified the presence of an abnormality in iron metabolism (hereditary hemochromatosis, heterozygotes, and homozygotes) with approximately 95 percent accuracy. This finding helps in the early diagnosis of hereditary hemochromatosis, especially while serum ferritin still remains low. The retained iron in hereditary hemochromatosis is primarily deposited in parenchymal cells, with reticuloendothelial cell accumulation occurring very late in the disease. This is in contrast to transfusional iron overload in which iron deposition occurs first in the reticuloendothelial cells and then in parenchymal cells. This explains why ferritin levels remain relative low in hereditary hemochromatosis, while transferrin saturation is high.

=== In chronic liver diseases ===
Hematological abnormalities often associate with chronic liver diseases. Both iron overload and iron deficient anemia have been reported in patients with liver cirrhosis. The former is mainly due to reduced hepcidin level caused by the decreased synthetic capacity of the liver, while the latter is due to acute and chronic bleeding caused by portal hypertension. Inflammation is also present in patients with advanced chronic liver disease. As a consequence, elevated hepatic and serum ferritin levels are consistently reported in chronic liver diseases.

Studies showed association between high serum ferritin levels and increased risk of short-term mortality in cirrhotic patients with acute decompensation and acute-on-chronic liver failure. An other study found association between high serum ferritin levels and increased risk of long-term mortality in compensated and stable decompensated cirrhotic patients. The same study demonstrated that increased serum ferritin levels could predict the development of bacterial infection in stable decompensated cirrhotic patients, while in compensated cirrhotic patients the appearance of the very first acute decompensation episode showed higher incidence in patients with low serum ferritin levels. This latter finding was explained by the association between chronic bleeding and increased portal pressure.

== Discovery ==
Ferritin was discovered in 1937 by the Czech scientist Vilém Laufberger. Sam Granick and Leonor Michaelis produced apoferritin in 1942.

== Applications ==
Ferritin is used in materials science as a precursor in making iron nanoparticles (NP) for carbon nanotube growth by chemical vapor deposition. It has also been shown to effectively store electrons for hours and to facilitate electron tunneling under ambient conditions, properties that may be involved in biological processes.

Cavities formed by ferritin and mini-ferritins (Dps) proteins have been successfully used as the reaction chamber for the fabrication of metal nanoparticles. Protein shells served as a template to restrain particle growth and as a coating to prevent coagulation/aggregation between NPs. Using various sizes of protein shells, various sizes of NPs can be easily synthesized for chemical, physical and bio-medical applications.

Experimental COVID-19 vaccines have been produced that display the spike protein's receptor binding domain on the surface of ferritin nanoparticles.

Apoferritin is also the most commonly-used protein to test resolution in Cryogenic Electron Microscopy (Cryo-EM) single particle analysis, due to its highly symmetrical shape and ease of sample preparation. Apoferritin holds the current record for the highest resolution structure determined by cryo-EM at around 1.1-1.2 Å.

== See also ==
- Bacterioferritin
- DNA-binding protein from starved cells
- Ferritin light chain
- Transferrin
