= Ferroxidase =

Iron oxidizing enzyme, Fe(II) to Fe(III) conversion

Identifiers
- EC no.: 1.16.3.1
- CAS no.: 9031-37-2

Databases
- IntEnz: IntEnz view
- BRENDA: BRENDA entry
- ExPASy: NiceZyme view
- KEGG: KEGG entry
- MetaCyc: metabolic pathway
- PRIAM: profile
- PDB structures: RCSB PDB PDBe PDBsum
- Gene Ontology: AmiGO / QuickGO
Search
- PMC: articles
- PubMed: articles
- NCBI: proteins

Ferroxidase also known as Fe(II):oxygen oxidoreductase is an enzyme that catalyzes the oxidization of iron II to iron III:

4 Fe^{2+} + 4 H^{+} + O_{2} ⇔ 4 Fe^{3+} + 2H_{2}O

== Examples ==
Human genes encoding proteins with ferroxidase activity include:

- CP – Ceruloplasmin
- FTH1 – Ferritin heavy chain
- FTMT – Ferritin, mitochondrial
- HEPH - Hephaestin
