= FTH1 =

Protein-coding gene in the species Homo sapiens

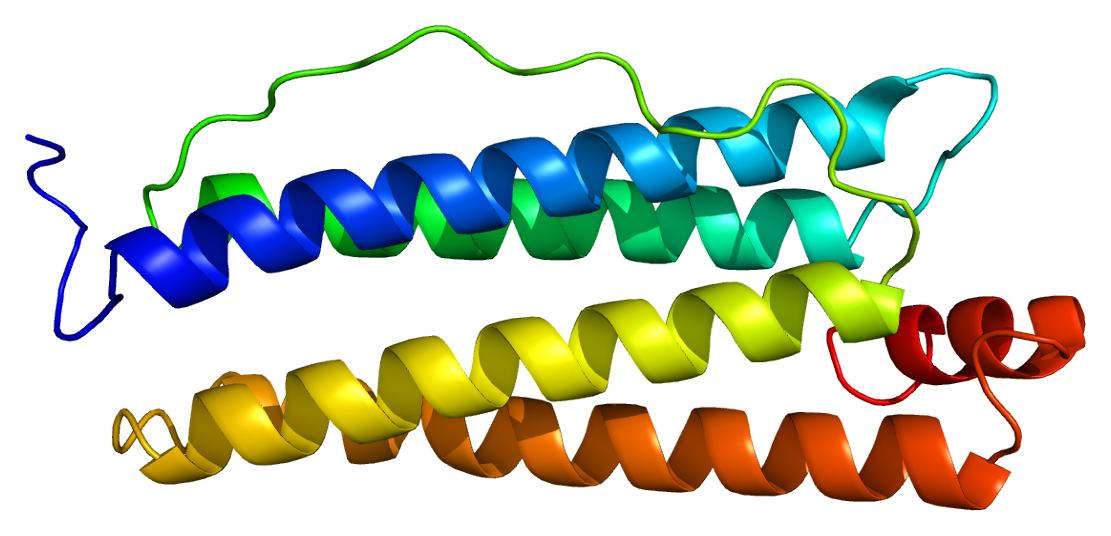

Identifiers
- Aliases: FTH1, FHC, FTH, FTHL6, HFE5, PIG15, PLIF, ferritin, heavy polypeptide 1, ferritin heavy chain 1
- External IDs: OMIM: 134770; MGI: 95588; GeneCards: FTH1
Available structures
PDB	Ortholog search: PDBe RCSB
PDB	List of PDB id codes 1FHA, 2CEI, 2CHI, 2CIH, 2CLU, 2CN6, 2CN7, 2FHA, 2IU2, 2Z6M, 3AJO, 3AJP, 3AJQ, 3ERZ, 3ES3, 4DYX, 4DYY, 4DYZ, 4DZ0, 4OYN, 4Y08, 4YKH, 4ZJK, 5CMQ, 5CMR
Enzyme activity
EC #	BRENDA	ExPASy	KEGG	MetaCyc
1.16.3.1	↗	↗	↗	↗

Gene location (Human)
Chr.	Chromosome 11 (human)
Band	11q12.3	Start	61,959,718 bp
Band	11q12.3	End	61,967,634 bp

Gene location (Mouse)
Chr.	Chromosome 19 (mouse)
Band	19 A|19 6.23 cM	Start	9,957,962 bp
Band	19 A|19 6.23 cM	End	9,962,462 bp
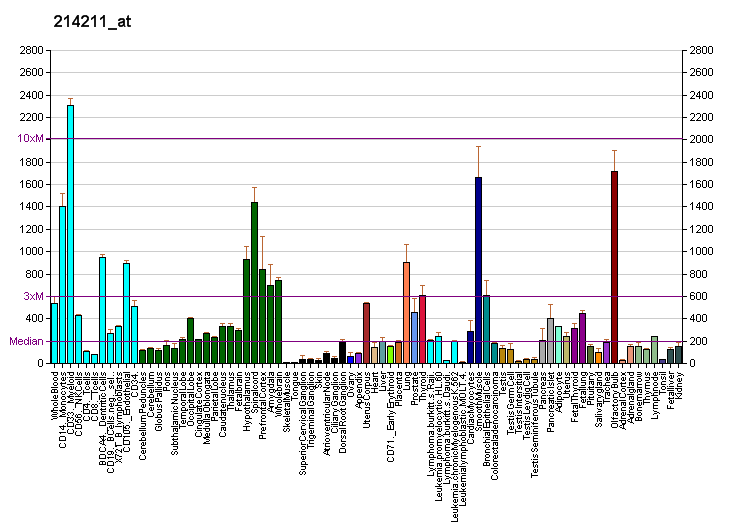

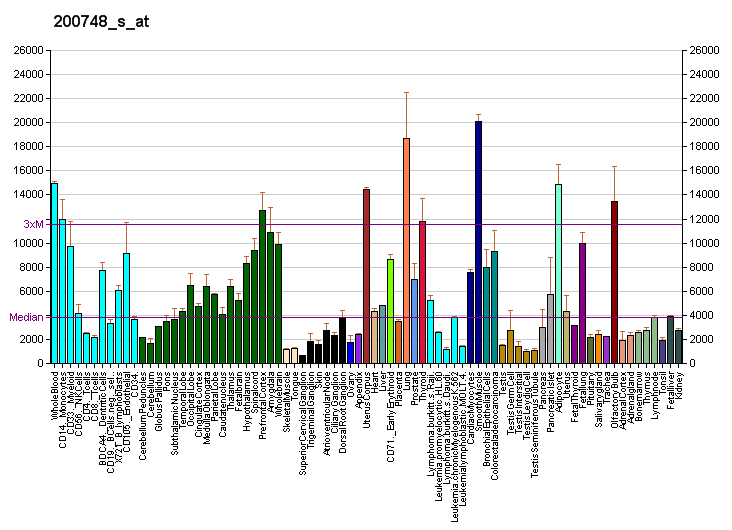
RNA expression pattern
Bgee	Human / Mouse (ortholog); Top expressed in: stromal cell of endometrium; upper lobe of left lung; tibial nerve; right lung; gastric mucosa; Descending thoracic aorta; mucosa of transverse colon; left coronary artery; C1 segment; right adrenal cortex / Top expressed in: globus pallidus; deep cerebellar nuclei; pontine nuclei; fetal liver hematopoietic progenitor cell; right kidney; lateral geniculate nucleus; endothelial cell of lymphatic vessel; lateral hypothalamus; dentate gyrus of hippocampal formation granule cell; gastrula; More reference expression data
BioGPS	More reference expression data
Gene ontology
Molecular function	ferric iron binding; metal ion binding; ferroxidase activity; protein binding; oxidoreductase activity; iron ion binding; ferrous iron binding; identical protein binding
Cellular component	cytosol; intracellular ferritin complex; extracellular exosome; nucleus; extracellular region; autolysosome; tertiary granule lumen; ficolin-1-rich granule lumen; cytoplasm
Biological process	intracellular sequestering of iron ion; iron ion transport; immune response; negative regulation of fibroblast proliferation; negative regulation of cell population proliferation; cellular iron ion homeostasis; neutrophil degranulation; negative regulation of necrotic cell death
Sources:Amigo / QuickGO
Orthologs
Databases	NCBI: entry; OMA: entry
Species	Human	Mouse
Entrez	2495	14319
Ensembl	ENSG00000167996	ENSMUSG00000024661
UniProt	P02794	P09528
RefSeq (mRNA)	NM_002032	NM_010239
RefSeq (protein)	NP_002023	NP_034369
Location (UCSC)	Chr 11: 61.96 – 61.97 Mb	Chr 19: 9.96 – 9.96 Mb
PubMed search
- Wikidata
View/Edit Human	View/Edit Mouse

Ferritin heavy chain is a ferroxidase enzyme that in humans is encoded by the FTH1 gene. FTH1 gene is located on chromosome 11, and its mutation causes Hemochromatosis type 5.

== Function ==
This gene encodes the heavy subunit of ferritin, the major intracellular iron storage protein in prokaryotes and eukaryotes. It is composed of 24 subunits of the heavy and light ferritin chains. Variation in ferritin subunit composition may affect the rates of iron uptake and release in different tissues. A major function of ferritin is the storage of iron in a soluble and nontoxic state. Defects in ferritin proteins are associated with several neurodegenerative diseases. This gene has multiple pseudogenes. Several alternatively spliced transcript variants have been observed, but their biological validity has not been determined.

== Interactions ==
FTH1 has been shown to interact with ferritin light chain.

== See also ==
- Ferritin
