= Aluminium toxicity in people on dialysis =

- Other names: Aluminium toxicity
- Symptoms: Acute or subacute changes in mental status, proximal muscle weakness, bone pain, numerous nonhealing fractures, and early osteoporosis.
- Causes: High levels of aluminium in water used to prepare dialysate.
- Diagnostic method: Blood aluminium concentrations greater than 100 μg/L.
- Treatment: Avoiding aluminium exposure; chelation.
- Medication: Deferoxamine.
- Frequency: 2.2% among dialysis patients.

Aluminium toxicity in people on dialysis is a problem for people on haemodialysis. Aluminium is often found in unfiltered water used to prepare dialysate. The dialysis process does not efficiently remove excess aluminium from the body, so it may build up over time. Aluminium is a potentially toxic metal, and aluminium poisoning may lead to mainly three disorders: aluminium-induced bone disease, microcytic anemia and neurological dysfunction (encephalopathy). Such conditions are more prominently observed in people with chronic kidney failure and especially in people on haemodialysis.

About 5–10 mg of aluminium enters human body daily through different sources like water, food, occupational exposure to aluminium in industries, and so on. In people with normal kidney function, serum aluminium is normally lower than 6 microgram/L. Baseline levels of serum aluminium should be <20 microgram/L. According to AAMI, standard aluminium levels in the dialysis fluid should be less than 0.01 milligram/L.

== Signs and symptoms ==
The symptoms of aluminium poisoning tend to be nonspecific. Acute or subacute changes in mental status, proximal muscle weakness, bone pain, numerous nonhealing fractures, and early osteoporosis are common presentations in chronic poisoning. Patients may also exhibit dementia, mutism, and convulsions.

Excessive aluminium has been found to cause anemia and has a direct impact on hematopoiesis. Patients with aluminium toxicity have been found to have microcytic anemia, anisocytosis, poikilocytosis, chromophilic cells, and basophilic stippling on their peripheral smears.

== Diagnosis ==
In general, aluminium concentrations in the blood will be less than 10 μg/L, or fewer than 60 μg/L in dialysis patients. Toxicity usually occurs at concentrations greater than 100 μg/L. Aluminium levels in the blood, bone, urine, and feces can be measured to confirm aluminium load and toxicosis.

== Prevention ==
Aluminium toxicity is known to result from high levels of aluminium in water used to prepare dialysate; therefore, aluminium levels in water supplies used to prepare dialysate must be measured on a regular basis, especially in regions where aluminium is added to the water supply as well as areas with high aluminium concentrations in ground or surface water.

The method used to purify water is determined by specific local concerns and needs. Water softeners remove only a small amount of aluminium, mixed-bed deionization removes aluminium in certain instances, and reverse osmosis is the most effective at removing aluminium.

Aluminium absorption from aluminium-containing gels is the primary source of aluminium buildup in dialysis patients in areas with appropriate water treatment. When plasma aluminium levels rise, the dosage of the aluminium-gels should be substantially reduced or discontinued.

== Treatment ==
Aluminium poisoning is treated by avoiding aluminium exposure and attempting to remove the element from the body's reserves by chelation.

A serum aluminium level of 50-60 μg/L indicates aluminium overload, may correlate with toxicity, and can be used to initiate chelation therapy in symptomatic individuals. Patients with clinical signs of chronic aluminium toxicity and serum aluminium levels greater than 20 μg/L may also be evaluated for chelation.
