= ALAS1 =

Protein-coding gene in the species Homo sapiens

Identifiers
- Aliases: ALAS1, ALAS, ALAS3, ALASH, MIG4, ALAS-H, 5'-aminolevulinate synthase 1
- External IDs: OMIM: 125290; MGI: 87989; GeneCards: ALAS1
Enzyme activity
EC #	BRENDA	ExPASy	KEGG	MetaCyc
2.3.1.37	↗	↗	↗	↗

Gene location (Human)
Chr.	Chromosome 3 (human)
Band	3p21.2	Start	52,198,086 bp
Band	3p21.2	End	52,214,327 bp

Gene location (Mouse)
Chr.	Chromosome 9 (mouse)
Band	9|9 F1	Start	106,110,654 bp
Band	9|9 F1	End	106,125,853 bp
RNA expression pattern
Bgee	Human / Mouse (ortholog); Top expressed in: right adrenal cortex; left adrenal gland; left adrenal cortex; oocyte; secondary oocyte; right lobe of liver; right ventricle; myocardium of left ventricle; mucosa of transverse colon; apex of heart / Top expressed in: adrenal gland; right kidney; right lung; right lung lobe; lacrimal gland; brown adipose tissue; cardiac muscle tissue of left ventricle; muscle of thigh; right ventricle; granulocyte; More reference expression data
BioGPS	n/a
Gene ontology
Molecular function	transferase activity; pyridoxal phosphate binding; acyltransferase activity; protein binding; catalytic activity; 5-aminolevulinate synthase activity; identical protein binding
Cellular component	mitochondrial matrix; mitochondrion; nucleoplasm; cytosol
Biological process	heme biosynthetic process; mitochondrion organization; metabolism; protoporphyrinogen IX biosynthetic process; biosynthetic process; tetrapyrrole biosynthetic process; porphyrin-containing compound metabolic process; regulation of lipid metabolic process
Sources:Amigo / QuickGO
Orthologs
Databases	NCBI: entry; OMA: entry
Species	Human	Mouse
Entrez	211	11655
Ensembl	ENSG00000023330	ENSMUSG00000032786
UniProt	P13196	Q8VC19
RefSeq (mRNA)	NM_000688; NM_001304443; NM_001304444; NM_199166	NM_001291835; NM_020559
RefSeq (protein)	NP_000679; NP_001291372; NP_001291373; NP_954635	NP_001278764; NP_065584
Location (UCSC)	Chr 3: 52.2 – 52.21 Mb	Chr 9: 106.11 – 106.13 Mb
PubMed search
- Wikidata
View/Edit Human	View/Edit Mouse

Delta-aminolevulinate synthase 1 also known as ALAS1 is a protein that in humans is encoded by the ALAS1 gene. ALAS1 is an aminolevulinic acid synthase.

Delta-aminolevulinate synthase catalyzes the condensation of glycine with succinyl-CoA to form delta-aminolevulinic acid. This nuclear-encoded mitochondrial enzyme is the first and rate-limiting enzyme in the mammalian heme biosynthetic pathway. There are 2 tissue-specific isozymes: a housekeeping enzyme encoded by the ALAS1 gene and an erythroid tissue-specific enzyme encoded by ALAS2.

Mice lacking this gene exhibit embryonic lethality, indicating that ALAS is essential for early embryogenesis.
