= Pappenheimer bodies =

Abnormal iron deposits in red blood cells

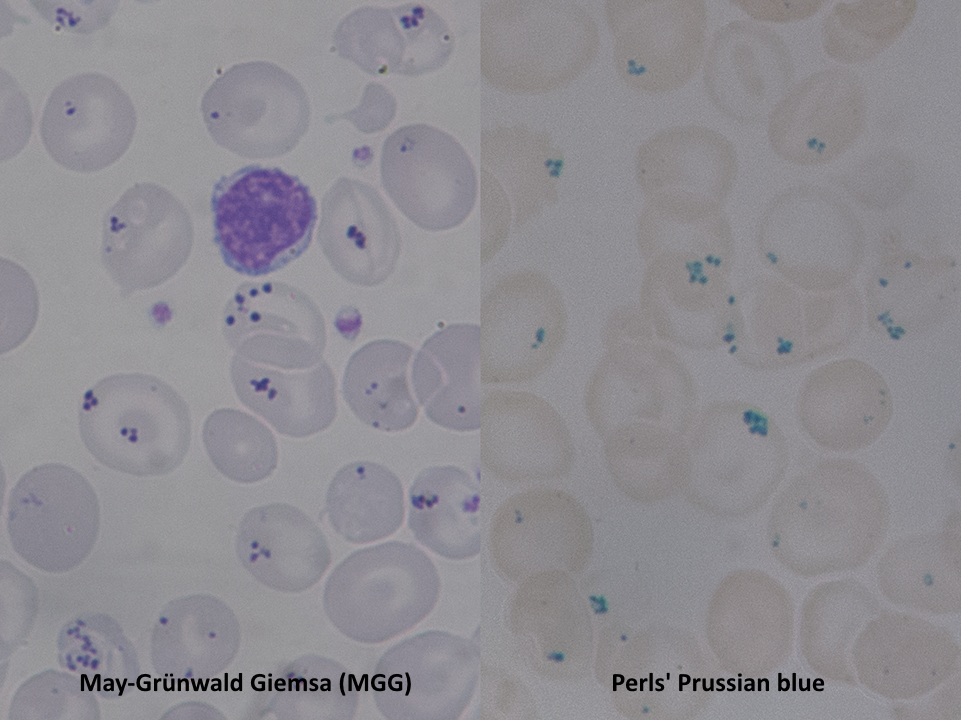
Pappenheimer bodies (Peripheral Blood / May-Grünwald Giemsa and Prussian blue stain)

Pappenheimer bodies are abnormal basophilic granules of iron found inside red blood cells on routine blood stain. They are a type of inclusion body composed of ferritin aggregates, or mitochondria or phagosomes containing aggregated ferritin. They appear as dense, blue-purple granules within the red blood cell and there are usually only one or two, located in the cell periphery. They stain on a Romanowsky stain because clumps of ribosomes are co‐precipitated with the iron‐containing organelles.

A cell containing Pappenheimer bodies is a siderocyte. Reticulocytes often contain Pappenheimer bodies. They are mostly observed in diseases such as myelodysplastic syndrome (MDS), sideroblastic anemia, hemolytic anemia, lead poisoning and sickle cell disease. They can interfere with platelet counts when the analysis is performed by electro-optical counters.

== Distinction with basophilic stippling ==
Pappenheimer bodies must be distinguished with other basophilic granules inside erythrocytes like the basophilic stippling. Contrary to the latter, they contain iron.

== History ==
In 1945, Alwin Max Pappenheimer Jr. et al. described three patients whose red blood cells, after splenectomy, showed inclusions when stained with Giemsa stain or Wright's stain.

== Diagnosis ==
Pappenheimer bodies are visible with a Wright and/or Giemsa stain. Confirmation of non-heme iron in the granules is made with a Perls' Prussian blue stain, and this atypical red blood cell is then known as a siderocyte. Only the finding of ring (or ringed) sideroblasts characterizes Sideroblastic anemia.
