= Microcytic anemia =

Microcytic anaemia
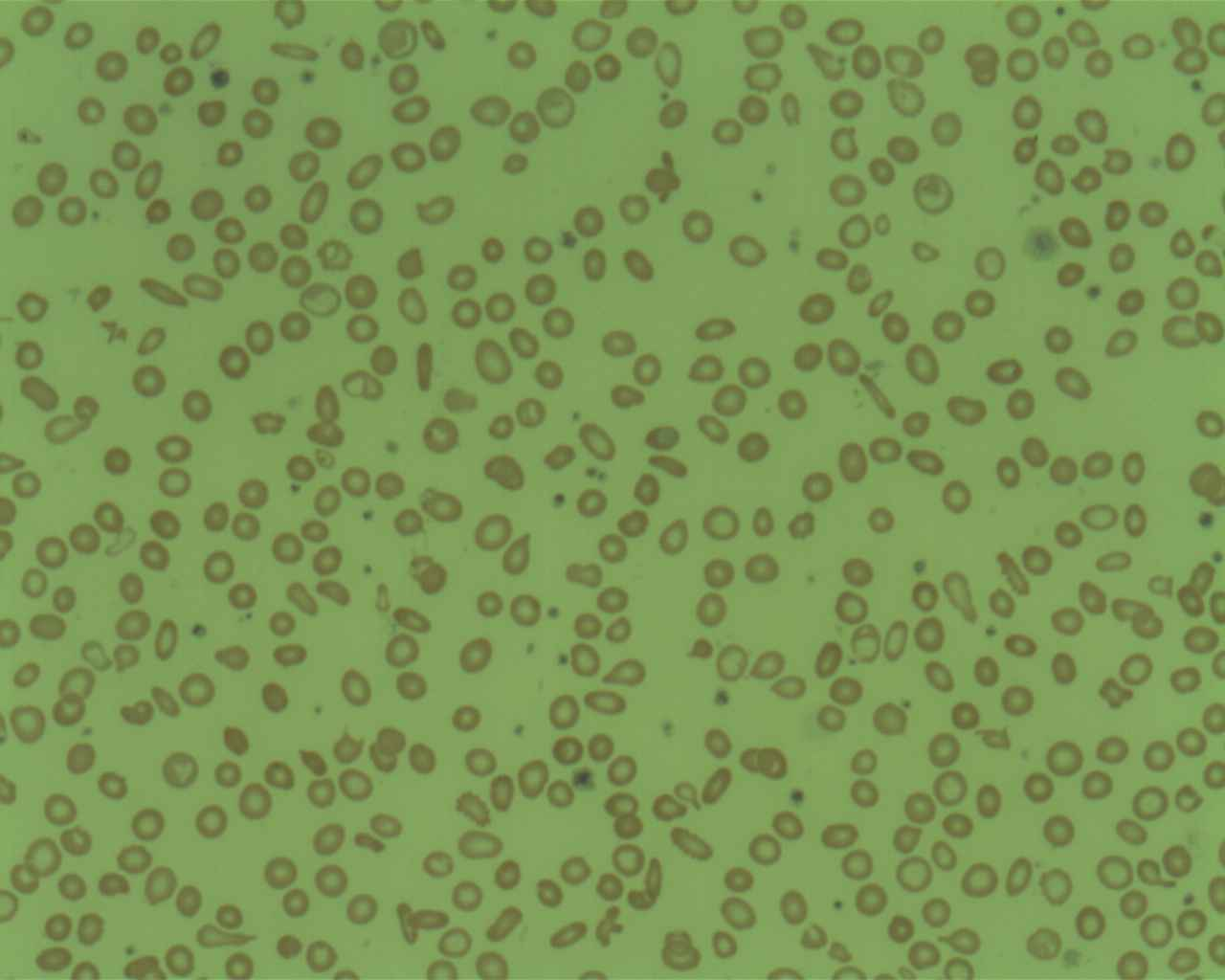
- Microcytosis is the presence of red cells that are smaller than normal. Normal adult red cell has a diameter of 7.2 µm. Microcytes are common seen with hypochromia in iron-deficiency anaemia, thalassaemia trait, congenital sideroblastic anaemia and sometimes in anaemia of chronic diseases.
- Specialty: Hematology

Microcytic anaemia is any of several types of anemia characterized by smaller than normal red blood cells (called microcytes). The normal mean corpuscular volume of a red blood cell is approximately 80–100 fL. When the MCV is <80 fL, the red cells are described as microcytic. MCV is the average red blood cell size. The main causes of microcytic anemia are iron-deficiency, lead poisoning, thalassemia, and anemia of chronic disease.

In microcytic anemia, the red blood cells (erythrocytes) contain less hemoglobin and are usually also hypochromic, meaning that the red blood cells appear paler than usual. This can be reflected by a low mean corpuscular hemoglobin concentration (MCHC), a measure representing the amount of hemoglobin per unit volume of fluid inside the cell; normally about 320–360 g/L or 32–36 g/dL. Typically, therefore, anemia of this category is described as "microcytic, hypochromic anemia".

== Causes ==
Typical causes of microcytic anemia include:

- Childhood
  - Iron deficiency anemia (50% of all anemias in humans are due to iron-deficiency)
  - Thalassemia
- Adulthood
  - Iron deficiency anemia
  - Thalassemia
  - Anemia of chronic disease

Rare hereditary causes of microcytic anemia include sideroblastic anemia and other X-linked anemias, hereditary hypotransferrinemia, hereditary aceruloplasminemia, erythropoietic protoporphyria, iron-refractory iron deficiency anemia, and other thalassemic mutations (such as hemoglobin E and hemoglobin Lepore syndrome).

Rarer acquired causes of microcytic anemia include lead poisoning, zinc deficiency, copper deficiency, alcohol, and certain medications.

Other causes that are typically thought of as causing normocytic anemia or macrocytic anemia must also be considered, as the presence of two or more causes of anemia can distort the typical picture.

=== Iron-deficiency anemia ===
Nearly half of all anemia cases are due to iron deficiency as it is the most common nutritional disorder. Although it is a common nutritional disorder, most causes of iron-deficiency anemia (IDA) are due to blood loss. It occurs most commonly among children and females who are menstruating but can happen to any individual of any age. Patients with IDA will have low MCV, low serum ferritin, low serum iron, and low transferrin saturation. Differential diagnoses for IDA include lead poisoning, anemia of chronic disease, hemoglobin CC disease, hemoglobin DD disease, autoimmune hemolytic anemia, hemoglobin S-beta thalassemia, and other fatigue-causing conditions like fibromyalgia, depression, hypothyroidism, etc. A patient may present with pallor, conjunctivitis, tachycardia, increased respiratory rate, exhaustion, or koilonychia (spoon-shaped nails); severe cases may also present with angina.

=== Anemia of chronic disease ===
Anemia of chronic disease (ACD) is the second most common cause of anemia after IDA. It is often fairly mild and sometimes asymptomatic, with potential symptoms including fatigue, headache, paleness, and shortness of breath.

Anemia of chronic disease is usually a result of chronic infections, autoimmune diseases, and cancer. It also occurs in individuals that have chronic inflammation due to a medical condition. Both diagnosis and treatment can be difficult as there may be an overlap with iron deficiency and thus it is typically a diagnosis of exclusion. Diagnosis may involve a review of the morphology of the blood film and bone marrow, reticulocyte count, stool analysis, serum bilirubin and lactate dehydrogenase assay, and assessment of renal function. Since ACD is caused by an underlying disorder, complete resolution of the condition is unlikely and treatments focus on controlling the inflammatory disorder rather than treating the ACD itself. Potential inflammatory conditions that can cause ACD are pulmonary tuberculosis, rheumatoid arthritis, and malignancies among many others. ACD is more common in older individuals. It affects almost 80% of the elderly in whom no other clear cause of anemia has been reported, which also suggests a multifactorial etiology.

=== Thalassemia ===
Thalassemia is an inherited condition that has variants in alpha or beta globin genes that result in lower levels of globin chains required to make hemoglobin, resulting in alpha thalassemia or beta thalassemia, respectively. Diagnosis is made by DNA analysis for alpha thalassemia and hemoglobin electrophoresis for beta thalassemia. Management of thalassemia involves life-long blood transfusions that maintain a hemoglobin level that reduces symptoms of anemia, as well as suppresses extramedullary hematopoiesis which can lead to multiple morbidities. Folic acid supplements are also recommended for some cases of thalassemia.

== Evaluation and diagnosis ==
In theory, the three most common microcytic anemias (iron deficiency anemia, anemia of chronic disease, and thalassemia) can be differentiated by their red blood cell (RBC) morphologies. Anemia of chronic disease shows unremarkable RBCs, iron deficiency shows anisocytosis, anisochromia and elliptocytosis, and thalassemias usually demonstrate target cells. Basophilic stippling is one morphologic finding of thalassemia which does not appear in iron deficiency or anemia of chronic disease. The patient should be in an ethnically at-risk group (e.g. Greek, Cypriot, Turkish, North African) and the diagnosis is not confirmed without a confirmatory method such as hemoglobin HPLC, H body staining, molecular testing or another reliable method. Coarse basophilic stippling occurs in other cases as seen in Table 1.

As IDA and ACD can often be confused, it is important to evaluate their laboratory parameters. IDA is associated with low hemoglobin, ferritin, transferrin saturation, and MCV. It is also associated with a normal C-reactive protein and high transferrin. ACD is associated as well with low hemoglobin but ferritin may be normal-high, and transferrin saturation, transferrin, and MCV may be low-normal. An additional difference between IDA and ACD is that ACD is often associated with high C-reactive protein.

== Treatment ==
Treatments for microcytic anemia depend on the cause of the anemia. Iron-deficiency anemia (IDA) is treated by addressing the underlying cause, for example gastrointestinal bleeding or inadequate dietary iron intake. In the latter case, the anemia can be treated via either dietary or pharmacological (oral or intravenous) iron supplementation. Non-pharmacological measures to treat IDA entail increasing the intake of dietary iron, especially from heme sources such as liver, seafood, and red meats. However, these measures often take a great deal of time longer to replenish iron stores compared to pharmacological agents such as iron supplements. Pharmacological agents may also be required in cases where deficiency is more severe, in cases where iron loss exceeds dietary intake, and in individuals who follow a plant-based diet as non-heme sources often have lower bioavailability. When oral iron supplements are used, they should be taken on an empty stomach to increase absorption. However, this may increase the risk of side effects such as nausea and epigastric pain. Individuals with severe IDA should limit physical activity until the deficiency has been corrected.

For ACD, iron therapy may not be effective because the pathogenesis is not an absolute iron deficiency but rather a relative deficiency in availability of iron to red cell precursors. However, in some cases iron may be administered orally or parenterally. Other potential treatments include red cell transfusion, administration of ω-3 poly-unsaturated fatty acids, or administration of erythropoiesis-stimulating agents.

Thalassemias are treated differently depending on severity. Mild cases may be treated with the prescription of a folic acid supplement to help red blood cells develop. Blood transfusions may be necessary for more severe cases; to prevent iron overload due to transfusions, chelation therapy may also be required to remove excess iron from the body. In some cases, bone marrow transplant, hematopoietic stem cell transplantation, gene therapy, or other treatments may be utilized.

== Outlook ==
The prognosis for microcytic anemias depends on the cause of the anemia and the speed with which it is treated. For IDA, the prognosis is excellent as long as the underlying cause of the deficiency is addressed. However, if the cause is not addressed and the deficiency becomes chronic, the long-term prognosis is much poorer, especially in older adults and those with comorbidities. Untreated iron deficiency is associated with cognitive impairment, heart conditions, developmental delay in children, pregnancy complications, depression, and other negative outcomes.

For ACD, the prognosis largely depends on whether the underlying cause can be ameliorated.

The outlook for thalassemia depends on its severity and how consistently it is treated. The most severe forms may cause stillbirth or early death, while less severe forms and well-managed cases often do not shorten the expected lifespan.

== See also ==
- Hypochromic anemia
