= Basophilic stippling =

Cytoplasmic granules in basophils

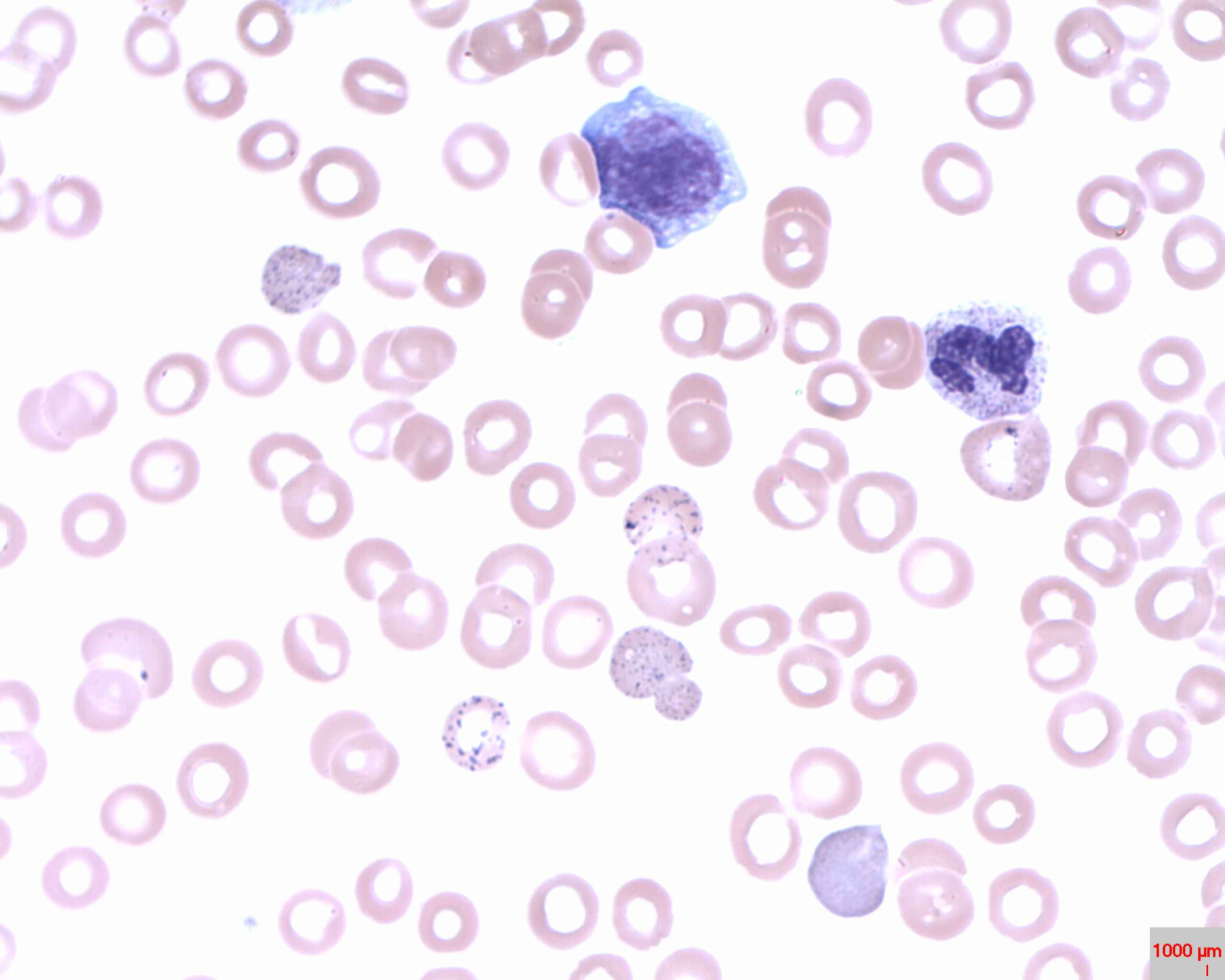
Blood smear showing red blood cells with basophilic stippling

Basophilic stippling, also known as punctate basophilia, is the presence of numerous basophilic granules that are dispersed through the cytoplasm of erythrocytes in a peripheral blood smear. They can be demonstrated to be RNA. They are composed of aggregates of ribosomes; degenerating mitochondria and siderosomes may be included in the aggregates. In contrast to Pappenheimer bodies, they are negative with Perls' acid ferrocyanide stain for iron (i.e. no iron in basophilic stippling). Basophilic stippling is indicative of disturbed erythropoiesis. It can also be found in some normal individuals.

== Associated conditions ==
- Thalassemia (β-thalassemia Minor (i.e. Trait) & Major, and α-thalassemia, only when 3 gene loci defective: (--/-α))
- Severe megaloblastic anemia
- Hemolytic anemia
- Sickle-cell anemia
- Pyrimidine 5' nucleotidase deficiency
- Alcoholism
- Myelodysplastic syndromes
- Sideroblastic anemia
- Congenital dyserythropoietic anemia
- Primary myelofibrosis
- Leukemia
- Erythroleukemia
- Hemorrhage, e.g. from gastrointestinal tract
- CPD-choline phosphotransferase deficiency
- Unstable hemoglobins
- Altered hemoglobin biosynthesis
- Heavy metal poisoning
  - Lead poisoning
  - Zinc
  - Arsenic
  - Silver
  - Mercury
