= Microcyte =

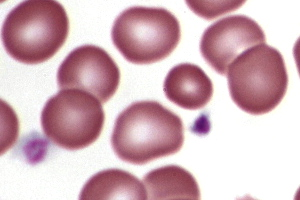
- Microcyte.
- Specialty: Hematology

A microcyte is an abnormally sized red blood cell. By definition, it is 5 micrometers or smaller in diameter with a mean corpuscular value less than 80fL. It is often associated with several forms of anemia. Microcytes are associated with the most common cause of anemia in children and adults. Many causes of microcytes can be seen at birth; however, some variations are acquired. The most common cause of microcytes is iron availability and/or iron metabolism.

== Causes ==
Typically, three main causes can be attributed to the formation of microcytes. The three include defects in the globin chain, defects in the synthesis of the heme structure, and issues with iron availability or iron binding. These causes result in structural abnormalities that cause the erythrocyte to become smaller in size due to a missing component of the red blood cell.

=== Globin chain defect ===
Red blood cells are made up of four globin structures, which are two alpha globins and two beta globins.

- Alpha thalassemia
- Beta thalassemia
- Hemoglobinopathy

=== Heme structure defects ===
Heme is the ring-shaped protein that sits at the core of the red blood cell and is responsible for the transportation of oxygen to the cells and carbon dioxide from the cells. Heme is a vital component of the synthesis and development of red blood cells.

- Porphyria
- Sideroblastic anemia

=== Iron metabolism/availability ===
This comes as a form of increased need for iron within the body, inadequate consumption, malabsorption, or significant blood loss. Iron binds to heme within red blood cells, which aids in the binding of oxygen to the red blood cells. Iron is also a necessary part of the synthesis of red blood cells.

- Dietary iron deficiency
- Anemia of chronic disease
- Sideroblastic anemia
- Atransferrinemia
- Excess bleeding
- Cancer

== Complications ==
The primary concern with microcytes is anemia, resulting from the small size of the red blood cells and their impact on red blood cell production. Many symptoms observed in a person with microcytes are secondary to the associated anemia, but can also be attributed to metabolic issues and a lack of iron binding.

=== Anemia Symptoms ===
- Fatigue
- Weakness
- Pale skin/mucus membranes
- Shortness of breath
- Tachycardia
- Dizziness/cognitive issues

=== Iron-Related Symptoms ===
- Pica
- Iron overload, causing organ damage
- Cognitive issues

== Treatment and Interventions ==
Treatments and interventions vary depending on the cause of microcytes. The mainstay of treatment is an iron supplement for many causes of microcytes. In chronic states of anemia, it is most important to treat the underlying cause of the disease state. In thalassemia, there are treatments dependent on the form of the disorder one inherits and the severity. This includes blood transfusion, chelation therapy for iron overload, consideration for splenectomy, and stem cell transplant. In the future, gene therapy has the potential to treat some of the gene-related disorders, with some studies showing that gene editing has successfully seen an increase in fetal hemoglobin levels, which would help with anemia. This could also be used in some genes that are seen with Iron metabolism.
