= GLRX5 =

Protein-coding gene in the species Homo sapiens

Identifiers
- Aliases: GLRX5, C14orf87, FLB4739, GRX5, PR01238, PRO1238, PRSA, SIDBA3, SPAHGC, glutaredoxin 5
- External IDs: OMIM: 609588; MGI: 1920296; GeneCards: GLRX5
Available structures
| PDB | Ortholog search: PDBe RCSB |
| PDB | List of PDB id codes 2MMZ, 2WUL |

Gene location (Human)
| Chr. | Chromosome 14 (human) |
| Band | 14q32.13 | Start | 95,533,503 bp |
| Band | 14q32.13 | End | 95,544,724 bp |

Gene location (Mouse)
| Chr. | Chromosome 12 (mouse) |
| Band | 12|12 E | Start | 104,998,947 bp |
| Band | 12|12 E | End | 105,009,165 bp |
RNA expression pattern
| Bgee | Human / Mouse (ortholog); Top expressed in: trabecular bone; thoracic diaphragm; triceps brachii muscle; Skeletal muscle tissue of biceps brachii; vastus lateralis muscle; glutes; myocardium of left ventricle; endothelial cell; cardiac muscle tissue of right atrium; right ventricle / Top expressed in: otolith organ; utricle; hand; human fetus; parotid gland; bone marrow; lacrimal gland; endothelial cell of lymphatic vessel; primitive streak; facial motor nucleus; More reference expression data |
| BioGPS | n/a |
Gene ontology
| Molecular function | protein-disulfide reductase activity; electron transfer activity; iron-sulfur cluster binding; metal ion binding; 2 iron, 2 sulfur cluster binding; disulfide oxidoreductase activity; protein binding; glutathione disulfide oxidoreductase activity |
| Cellular component | soma; dendrite; nucleus; mitochondrion; mitochondrial matrix |
| Biological process | cell redox homeostasis; protein lipoylation; small molecule metabolic process; electron transport chain; hemopoiesis |
Sources:Amigo / QuickGO
Orthologs
| Databases | NCBI: entry; OMA: entry |
| Species | Human | Mouse |
| Entrez | 51218 | 73046 |
| Ensembl | ENSG00000182512 | ENSMUSG00000021102 |
| UniProt | Q86SX6 | Q80Y14 |
| RefSeq (mRNA) | NM_016417 | NM_028419 |
| RefSeq (protein) | NP_057501 | NP_082695 |
| Location (UCSC) | Chr 14: 95.53 – 95.54 Mb | Chr 12: 105 – 105.01 Mb |
| PubMed search |
- Wikidata
| View/Edit Human | View/Edit Mouse |

Glutaredoxin 5, also known as GLRX5, is a protein which in humans is encoded by the GLRX5 gene located on chromosome 14. This gene encodes a mitochondrial protein, which is evolutionarily conserved. It is involved in the biogenesis of iron- sulfur clusters, which are required for normal iron homeostasis. Mutations in this gene are associated with autosomal recessive pyridoxine-refractory sideroblastic anemia.

== Structure ==
The GLRX5 gene contains 2 exons and encodes for a protein that is 13 kDa in size. The protein is highly expressed in erythroid cells. Crystal structure of the GLRX5 protein reveals that the protein likely exists as a tetramer with two Fe-S clusters buried in the interior.

== Function ==
GLRX5 is a mitochondrial protein, found in mitochondrial matrix and it is conserved evolutionarily and plays a role in the formation of iron-sulfur clusters, which function to maintain iron homeostasis within the mitochondria and in the cell. GLRX5 is required for the steps in haem synthesis that involves mitochondrial enzymes, and is therefore involved in hematopoiesis. GLRX5 activity is required for normal regulation of hemoglobin synthesis by the iron-sulfur protein ACO1. The function of GLRX5 is highly conserved evolutionarily.

== Clinical significance ==
Mutations in the GLRX5 gene have been associated with sideroblastic anemia, variant glycine encephalopathy (also known as non-ketotic hyperglycinemia, NKH). as well as pyridoxine-refractory, autosomal recessive anemia (PRARSA). Cells with mutations in GLRX5 activity show deficiency in Fe-S cluster synthesis, which is likely causative of the observed symptoms.

== See also ==
- glutaredoxin
