= Iron poisoning =

Type of metal poisoning

Iron poisoning typically occurs from ingestion of excess iron that results in acute toxicity. Mild symptoms which occur within hours include vomiting, diarrhea, abdominal pain, and drowsiness. In more severe cases, symptoms can include tachypnea, low blood pressure, seizures, or coma. If left untreated, acute iron poisoning can lead to multi-organ failure resulting in permanent organ damage or death.

Iron is available over the counter as a single entity supplement in an iron salt form or in combination with vitamin supplements and is commonly used in the treatment of anemias. Iron dosing is important to consider. Some say that most men only need to consume 10mg iron per day, though this may vary. Many would advise never to exceed 45mg iron per day. 45mg of iron per day is often considered a very high dose. Overdoses on iron can be categorized as unintentional ingestion which is predominantly associated with children or intentional ingestion involving suicide attempts in adults. Unintentional ingestion of iron containing drug products are a major cause of mortality in children under the age of 6 years old in the United States. As a response, in 1997 the US Food and Drug Administration (FDA) implemented a regulation requiring warning labels and unit dose packaging for products containing more than 30 mg of elemental iron per dose.

The diagnosis of iron poisoning is based on clinical presentation including laboratory tests for serum iron concentrations and metabolic acidosis along with physical examination. Treatment for iron poisoning involves providing fluid replacement, gastrointestinal decontamination, administering deferoxamine intravenously, liver transplants, and monitoring the patient's condition. The degree of intervention required depends on whether the patient is at risk for serious toxicity.

== Signs and symptoms ==
Manifestation of iron poisoning may vary depending on the amount of iron ingested by the individual and is further classified by five stages based on timing of signs and symptoms. In mild to moderate cases, individuals may be asymptomatic or only experience mild gastrointestinal symptoms that resolve within six hours. In serious cases, individuals may present with systemic signs and symptoms and require treatment. Clinical presentation of iron poisoning in the absence of treatment progresses in five stages: the gastrointestinal phase, latent phase, metabolic acidosis and shock phase, hepatotoxicity phase, and bowel obstruction due to scarring.

Stages of Iron Toxicity
Stage	Phase	Time Post-Ingestion	Clinical Presentation
1	Gastrointestinal	30 minutes to 6 hours	Abdominal pain, diarrhea, vomiting, black stool
2	Latent	6 to 24 hours	None
3	Metabolic Acidosis and Shock	6 to 72 hours	Hypovolemic shock, low blood pressure, rapid breathing, shortness of breath, tachycardia
4	Hepatotoxicity	12 to 96 hours	Acute liver failure
5	Bowel Obstruction	2 to 8 weeks	Vomiting, obstruction of small intestine preventing passage of food (due to scarring)

The first indication of iron poisoning occurs within the first six hours post-ingestion and involves gastrointestinal symptoms including abdominal pain accompanied by nausea and vomiting with or without blood. Due to the disintegration of iron tablets, the stool may appear as black or dark green or gray. After the first stage, gastrointestinal symptoms appear to resolve in the latent phase and individuals may show signs of improvement. Following this stage, the iron begins to affect the cells of the body's organs which manifests as numerous systemic signs and symptoms developing after 6 to 72 hours, in the metabolic acidosis phase. Individuals may present with signs of cardiogenic shock indicated by low blood pressure, rapid heart rate and severe shortness of breath. Hypovolemic shock occurs due to loss of blood from the gastrointestinal bleeding caused by the iron. During this phase, metabolic acidosis may also develop damaging internal organs such as the brain and liver. In the fourth stage taking place 12 to 96 hours after ingestion, liver toxicity and failure occurs as the cells begin to die. In the last stage of iron poisoning following 2 to 8 weeks after ingestion, scarring of the gastrointestinal mucosal lining resulting in bowel obstruction.

== Cause ==
=== Pathophysiology ===
Iron is essential for the production of hemoglobin in red blood cells which is responsible for transporting oxygen throughout the body. In normal physiologic conditions, nonionic forms of iron (Fe°) are converted into ferrous iron (Fe^{2+}) by gastric acid in the stomach. Ferrous iron is then absorbed in the small intestine where it is oxidized into its ferric iron (Fe^{3+}) form before being released into the bloodstream. Free iron in the blood is toxic to the body as it disrupts normal cell function, damaging organs such as the liver, stomach, and cardiovascular system. The human body has protective mechanisms in place to prevent excess free ferric iron from circulating the body. When being transported throughout the body, iron is bound to an iron transporting protein called transferrin to prevent iron from being absorbed into different cells. Any excess iron is stored as ferritin in the liver. In the event of iron overdose, iron stores become oversaturated and the body's protective mechanisms fail resulting in excess free circulating iron.

=== Toxic Dose ===
Iron poisoning can occur when doses of 20 to 60 mg/kg or more of elemental iron is ingested with most cases reporting primarily gastrointestinal symptoms. Systemic signs and symptoms shown in serious toxicity occur at higher doses exceeding 60 mg/kg. Ingesting above 120 mg/kg may be fatal. The therapeutic dose for iron deficiency anemia is 3–6 mg/kg/day. Individuals who have ingested less than 20 mg/kg of elemental iron typically do not exhibit symptoms. It is unlikely to get iron poisoning from diet alone with iron supplements being the cause of overdose. The amount of elemental iron in an iron supplement can be calculated based on the percentage it constitutes for per tablet. For example, a 300 mg tablet of ferrous fumarate will contain 100 mg of elemental iron or 33%.

- Ferrous sulfate contains 20% elemental iron per mg of mineral salt
- Ferrous gluconate contains 12% elemental iron per mg of mineral salt
- Ferrous fumarate contains 33% elemental iron per mg of mineral salt

== Diagnosis ==
Iron toxicity is primarily a clinical diagnosis that involves getting a detailed patient history and physical examination of the individuals signs and symptoms. Information such as how much iron was ingested and the timing should be gathered to assess the level of toxicity. Signs for severe iron poisoning should be evaluated such as any confusion or extreme lethargy, increased heart rates, low blood pressure for adults. In children, signs of shock can be noted with behavioral changes such as decreased responsiveness, crying, and inability to focus. Persistent vomiting is often associated with iron poisoning and also used to determine severity of iron poisoning. Laboratory tests such as measuring the peak serum iron level after 4 to 6 hours of ingestion can be useful in determining the severity of iron toxicity. In general, levels below 350mcg/dL are associated with more mild iron poisoning while upper levels above 500mcg/dL are associated with more severe iron poisoning. Measuring electrolyte levels, kidney function, serum glucose, liver function tests (enzymes and bilirubin), complete blood count, clotting time via prothrombin and partial thromboplastin time, anion gap for metabolic acidosis, should be conducted for clinical monitoring and confirmation of iron poisoning.

The deferoxamine challenge test is a diagnostic test for confirming iron poisoning, however it is no longer recommended for diagnostic purposes due to concerns regarding the accuracy. Deferoxamine can be administered intramuscularly as a single dose where it then binds to free iron in the blood and is excreted into the urine turning it to a "brick orange" or pink/red/orange color. Radiographs are no longer used for diagnosis due to the lack of connection between severity of iron toxicity and the presence of radiopaque iron tablets in the stomach on X-rays. This method also requires that the ingested tablet to be radiopaque which most iron preparations are not.

== Treatment ==
Management of acute iron poisoning involves providing a patient with respiratory support and intravenous deferoxamine. Patients exhibiting severe symptoms in the gastrointestinal phase should receive volume resuscitation to prevent hypovolemic shock from the loss of blood volume. Normal saline is administered intravenously to maintain adequate volume of fluid in the body. Deferoxamine is a drug that is used in cases of serious iron poisoning. It is a chelating agent and binds to free iron in the body in order to be eliminated by the kidneys into urine. Dosing of deferoxamine should be determined through consultation with a toxicologist but is typically continuously infused at 15 mg/kg to 35 mg/kg per hour and not exceeding the maximum daily dose of 6 grams for adults. In pediatric patients, doses should not exceed 15 mg/kg per hour. recommended duration of treatment is until symptoms have resolved which is usually 24 hours. In non-fatal cases of iron poisoning where there is liver failure, liver transplantation may be necessary.

Treatment of iron poisoning should be based on clinical presentation, peak serum iron levels and other laboratory results. As a general guideline, patients who have ingested lower doses of elemental iron, have a peak serum iron level less than 500mcg/dL and are asymptomatic or only exhibit mild gastrointestinal symptoms typically do not require treatment and should be monitored for 6 hours after ingestion. In cases where high doses of elemental iron have been ingested and the patient is exhibiting signs and symptoms of severe systemic iron poisoning, supportive care measures like volume resuscitation and deferoxamine should be initiated immediately. A quick response to iron poisoning can significantly improve clinical outcomes.

== See also ==
- Overnutrition
- Iron overload
