= Mitochondrial glycine transporter =

Protein-coding gene in the species Homo sapiens

SLC25A38

Identifiers
- Aliases: SLC25A38, SIDBA2, solute carrier family 25 member 38
- External IDs: OMIM: 610819; MGI: 2384782; GeneCards: SLC25A38

Gene location (Human)
| Chr. | Chromosome 3 (human) |
| Band | 3p22.1 | Start | 39,383,370 bp |
| Band | 3p22.1 | End | 39,397,351 bp |

Gene location (Mouse)
| Chr. | Chromosome 9 (mouse) |
| Band | 9|9 F4 | Start | 119,939,440 bp |
| Band | 9|9 F4 | End | 119,953,570 bp |
RNA expression pattern
| Bgee | Human / Mouse (ortholog); Top expressed in: body of pancreas; right lobe of thyroid gland; left lobe of thyroid gland; right lobe of liver; rectum; right uterine tube; right adrenal cortex; mucosa of transverse colon; left adrenal gland; left ovary / Top expressed in: fetal liver hematopoietic progenitor cell; right kidney; tibiofemoral joint; granulocyte; yolk sac; zygote; superior ganglion of glossopharyngeal nerve; proximal tubule; secondary oocyte; muscle of thigh; More reference expression data |
| BioGPS | n/a |
Gene ontology
| Molecular function | glycine transmembrane transporter activity; transmembrane transporter activity |
| Cellular component | membrane; mitochondrion; mitochondrial inner membrane; integral component of membrane |
| Biological process | heme biosynthetic process; erythrocyte differentiation; mitochondrial transport; glycine import into mitochondrion |
Sources:Amigo / QuickGO
Orthologs
| Databases | NCBI: entry; OMA: entry |
| Species | Human | Mouse |
| Entrez | 54977 | 208638 |
| Ensembl | ENSG00000144659 | ENSMUSG00000032519 |
| UniProt | Q96DW6 | Q91XD8 |
| RefSeq (mRNA) | NM_017875; NM_001354798 | NM_144793 |
| RefSeq (protein) | NP_060345; NP_001341727 | NP_659042 |
| Location (UCSC) | Chr 3: 39.38 – 39.4 Mb | Chr 9: 119.94 – 119.95 Mb |
| PubMed search |
- Wikidata
| View/Edit Human | View/Edit Mouse |

Mitochondrial glycine transporter is a protein that in humans is encoded by the SLC25A38 gene. SLC25A38 is involved in mitochondrial handling of glycine and is needed for the first step in heme synthesis. Mutations in this gene can lead to an autosomal recessive form of sideroblastic anemia.
