= Anisochromia =

Color variation in red blood cells

Anisochromia is a marked variability in the color density of erythrocytes (red blood cells), which indicates unequal hemoglobin content among the red blood cells.

Sideroblastic anemia or other severe forms of anemia may cause anisochromatism. It can also be seen after blood transfusions are administered, because blood products from different people may have different chromacity.

== See also ==
- Anisocytosis
