= Streptomyces pilosus =

Scientific classification
- Domain: Bacteria
- Kingdom: Bacillati
- Phylum: Actinomycetota
- Class: Actinomycetes
- Order: Streptomycetales
- Family: Streptomycetaceae
- Genus: Streptomyces
- Species: S. pilosus

Binomial name
- Streptomyces pilosus Ettlinger et al. 1958

Type strain
- ATCC 19797, BCRC 12091, CBS 549.68, CCRC 12091, DSM 40097, ETH 11686, ICMP 145, IFO 12807, IMSNU 20271, ISP 5097, JCM 4403, KCC S-0403, KCCS-0403, KCTC 19058, NBRC 12807, NRRL 2721, NRRL B-2721, NRRL-ISP 5097, NZRCC 10338, RIA 1076, UNIQEM 183, VKM Ac-1765

Species of bacterium

Streptomyces pilosus is a bacterium species from the genus of Streptomyces which has been isolated from soil in Rome in Italy. Streptomyces pilosus produces piloquinone and the antidote desferrioxamine B.

== See also ==
- List of Streptomyces species
