= ALAS2 =

Protein-coding gene in humans

Identifiers
- Aliases: ALAS2, ALAS-E, ALASE, ANH1, ASB, XLDPP, XLEPP, XLSA, SIDBA1, 5'-aminolevulinate synthase 2
- External IDs: OMIM: 301300; MGI: 87990; GeneCards: ALAS2
Available structures
PDB	Ortholog search: PDBe RCSB
PDB	List of PDB id codes 1H7D, 1H7J
Enzyme activity
EC #	BRENDA	ExPASy	KEGG	MetaCyc
2.3.1.37	↗	↗	↗	↗

Gene location (Human)
Chr.	X chromosome (human)
Band	Xp11.21	Start	55,009,055 bp
Band	Xp11.21	End	55,030,977 bp

Gene location (Mouse)
Chr.	X chromosome (mouse)
Band	X F3|X 68.46 cM	Start	149,330,371 bp
Band	X F3|X 68.46 cM	End	149,353,634 bp
RNA expression pattern
Bgee	Human / Mouse (ortholog); Top expressed in: trabecular bone; bone marrow; bone marrow cell; blood; mononuclear cell; monocyte; testicle; placenta; ganglionic eminence; spleen / Top expressed in: blood; fetal liver hematopoietic progenitor cell; tibiofemoral joint; spleen; human fetus; internal carotid artery; left lung; external carotid artery; right lung; right lung lobe; More reference expression data
BioGPS	n/a
Gene ontology
Molecular function	transferase activity; glycine binding; protein binding; catalytic activity; pyridoxal phosphate binding; acyltransferase activity; 5-aminolevulinate synthase activity
Cellular component	mitochondrial matrix; mitochondrion; mitochondrial inner membrane
Biological process	response to hypoxia; protoporphyrinogen IX biosynthetic process; biosynthetic process; tetrapyrrole biosynthetic process; heme biosynthetic process; hemoglobin biosynthetic process; erythrocyte differentiation; metabolism; oxygen homeostasis; cellular iron ion homeostasis; porphyrin-containing compound metabolic process
Sources:Amigo / QuickGO
Orthologs
Databases	NCBI: entry; OMA: entry
Species	Human	Mouse
Entrez	212	11656
Ensembl	ENSG00000158578	ENSMUSG00000025270
UniProt	P22557	P08680
RefSeq (mRNA)	NM_000032; NM_001037967; NM_001037968; NM_001037969	NM_001102446; NM_009653
RefSeq (protein)	NP_000023; NP_001033056; NP_001033057	NP_001095916; NP_033783
Location (UCSC)	Chr X: 55.01 – 55.03 Mb	Chr X: 149.33 – 149.35 Mb
PubMed search
- Wikidata
View/Edit Human	View/Edit Mouse

Delta-aminolevulinate synthase 2 also known as ALAS2 is a protein that in humans is encoded by the ALAS2 gene. ALAS2 is an aminolevulinic acid synthase.

The product of this gene specifies an erythroid-specific mitochondrially located enzyme. The encoded protein catalyzes the first step in the heme biosynthetic pathway. Defects in this gene cause X-linked pyridoxine-responsive sideroblastic anemia. Alternatively spliced transcript variants encoding different isoforms have been identified.

Its gene contains an IRE in its 5'-UTR region on which an IRP binds if the iron level is too low, thus inhibiting its translation.
