= Sideroblastic anemia =

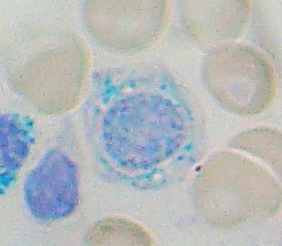
- A ring sideroblast visualized by Prussian blue stain
- Specialty: Hematology

Sideroblastic anemia, or sideroachrestic anemia, is a form of anemia in which the bone marrow produces ringed sideroblasts rather than healthy red blood cells (erythrocytes). In sideroblastic anemia, the body has iron available but cannot incorporate it into hemoglobin, which red blood cells need in order to transport oxygen efficiently. The disorder may be caused either by a genetic disorder or indirectly as part of myelodysplastic syndrome, which can develop into hematological malignancies (especially acute myeloid leukemia).

Sideroblasts (sidero- + -blast) are nucleated erythroblasts (precursors to mature red blood cells) with granules of iron accumulated in the mitochondria surrounding the nucleus. Normally, sideroblasts are present in the bone marrow, and enter the circulation after maturing into a normal erythrocyte. The presence of sideroblasts per se does not define sideroblastic anemia. Only the finding of ring (or ringed) sideroblasts characterizes sideroblastic anemia.

Ring sideroblasts are named so because iron-laden mitochondria form a ring around the nucleus. It is a subtype of basophilic granules of the erythrocyte, but which can only be seen in bone marrow. To count a cell as a ring sideroblast, the ring must encircle a third or more of the nucleus and contain five or more iron granules, according to the 2008 WHO classification of the tumors of the hematopoietic and lymphoid tissues.

== Types ==
The WHO International Working Group on Morphology of MDS (IWGM-MDS) defined three types of sideroblasts:

1. Type 1 sideroblasts: fewer than 5 siderotic granules in the cytoplasm
2. Type 2 sideroblasts: 5 or more siderotic granules, but not in a perinuclear distribution
3. Type 3 or ring sideroblasts: 5 or more granules in a perinuclear position, surrounding the nucleus or encompassing at least one third of the nuclear circumference.

Type 1 and type 2 are found in non-sideroblastic anemias. Type 3 is found only in sideroblastic anemia.

== Symptoms and signs ==
Symptoms of sideroblastic anemia include skin paleness, fatigue, dizziness, and enlarged spleen and liver. Heart disease, liver damage, and kidney failure can result from iron buildup in these organs.

Symptoms of sideroblastic anemia usually resemble the common symptoms of anemia. In addition to the symptoms listed above, patients with sideroblastic anemia may experience shortness of breath, heart palpitations, and headache. Some patients may have bronze-colored skin due to an overload of iron. Patients with syndromic hereditary sideroblastic anemia may experience diabetes mellitus and deafness.

== Causes ==
Causes of sideroblastic anemia can be categorized into three groups: congenital sideroblastic anemia, acquired clonal sideroblastic anemia, and acquired reversible sideroblastic anemia. All cases involve dysfunctional heme synthesis or processing. This leads to granular deposition of iron in the mitochondria that form a ring around the nucleus of the developing red blood cell. Congenital forms often present with normocytic or microcytic anemia while acquired forms of sideroblastic anemia are often normocytic or macrocytic.

- Congenital sideroblastic anemia
  - X-linked sideroblastic anemia: This is the most common congenital cause of sideroblastic anemia and involves a defect in ALAS2, which is involved in the first step of heme synthesis. Although X-linked, approximately one third of patients are women due to skewed X-inactivation (lyonizations).
  - Autosomal recessive sideroblastic anemia involves mutations in the SLC25A38 gene. The function of this protein is not fully understood, but it is involved in mitochondrial transport of glycine. Glycine is a substrate for ALAS2 and necessary for heme synthesis. The autosomal recessive form is typically severe in presentation.
  - Genetic syndromes: Rarely, sideroblastic anemia may be part of a congenital syndrome and present with associated findings, such as ataxia, myopathy, and pancreatic insufficiency.
- Acquired clonal sideroblastic anemia
  - Clonal sideroblastic anemias fall under the broader category of myelodysplastic syndromes (MDS). Three forms exist and include refractory anemia with ringed sideroblasts (RARS), refractory anemia with ringed sideroblasts and thrombocytosis (RARS-T), and refractory cytopenia with multilineage dysplasia and ringed sideroblasts (RCMD-RS). These anemias are associated with increased risk for leukemic evolution.
- Acquired reversible sideroblastic anemia
  - Causes include excessive alcohol use (the most common cause of sideroblastic anemia), pyridoxine deficiency (vitamin B_{6} is the cofactor in the first step of heme synthesis), lead poisoning and copper deficiency. Excess zinc can indirectly cause sideroblastic anemia by decreasing absorption and increasing excretion of copper. Antimicrobials that may lead to sideroblastic anemia include isoniazid (which interferes with pyridoxine metabolism), chloramphenicol (which, by inhibiting the synthesis of mitochondrial membrane protein, impairs mitochondrial respiration), cycloserine, and linezolid.

== Diagnosis ==
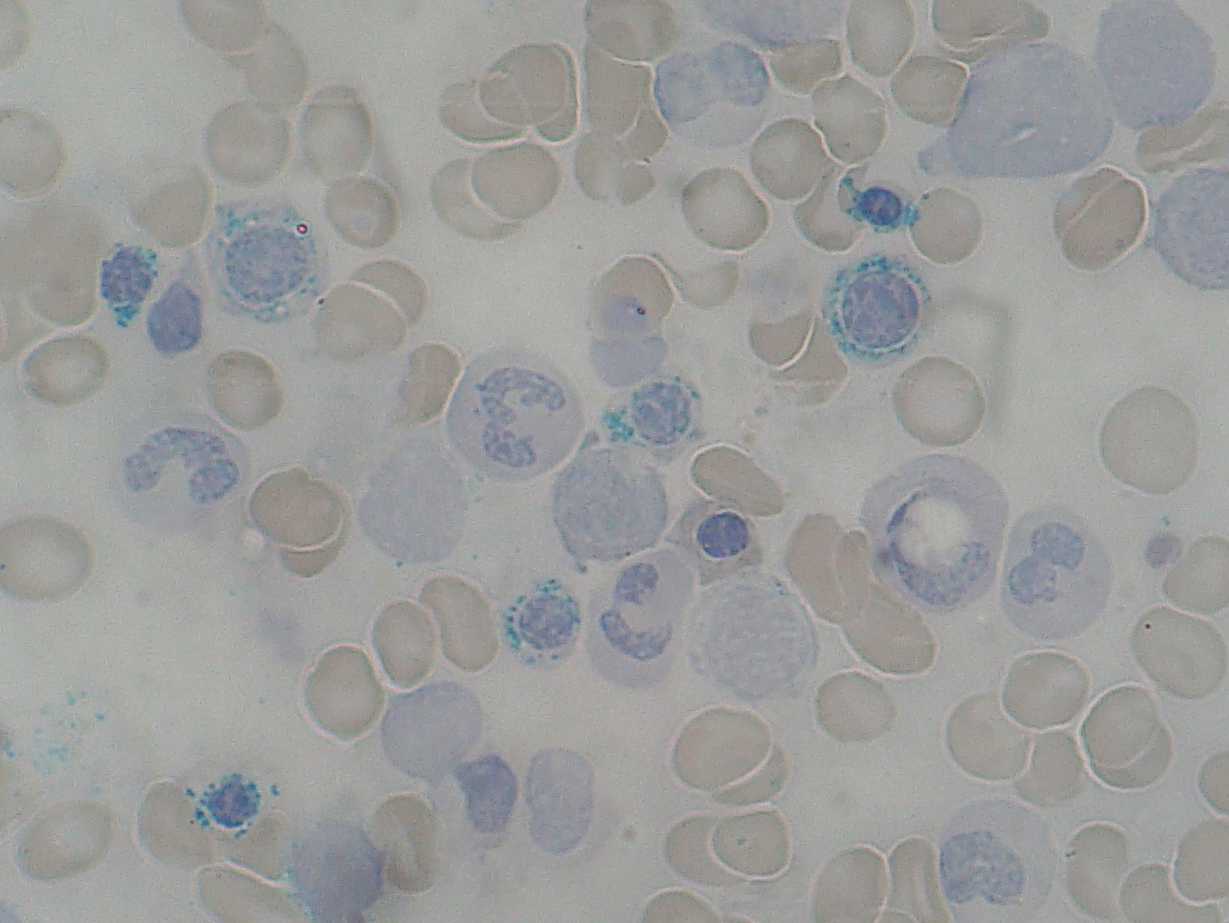
Bone marrow aspirate: ring sideroblasts

Ringed sideroblasts are seen in the bone marrow.

On the peripheral blood smear can be found erythrocytes with basophilic stippling (cytoplasmic granules of RNA precipitates) and Pappenheimer bodies (cytoplasmic granules of iron).

The anemia is moderate to severe and dimorphic. Microscopic viewing of the red blood cells will reveal marked unequal cell size and abnormal cell shape. Basophilic stippling is marked and target cells are common. The mean cell volume is commonly decreased (i.e., a microcytic anemia), but it may also be normal or even high. The RDW is increased with the red blood cell histogram shifted to the left. Leukocytes and platelets are normal. Bone marrow shows erythroid hyperplasia with a maturation arrest.In excess of 40% of the developing erythrocytes are ringed sideroblasts. Serum iron, percentage saturation and ferritin are increased. The total iron-binding capacity of the cells is normal to decreased. Stainable marrow hemosiderin is increased.

=== Classification ===
Sideroblastic anemia is typically divided into subtypes based on its cause.

- Hereditary or congenital sideroblastic anemia may be X-linked or autosomal.

OMIM	Name	Gene
300751	X-linked sideroblastic anemia (XLSA)	ALAS2
301310	sideroblastic anemia with spinocerebellar ataxia (ASAT)	ABCB7
205950	pyridoxine-refractory autosomal recessive sideroblastic anemia	SLC25A38
206000	pyridoxine-responsive sideroblastic anemia	(vitamin B6 deficiency; pyridoxal phosphate required for heme synthesis)

GLRX5 has also been implicated.

- Acquired, or secondary, sideroblastic anemia develops after birth and is divided according to its cause.

=== Laboratory findings ===
- Serum Iron: high
- increased ferritin levels
- decreased total iron-binding capacity
- high transferrin saturation
- Hematocrit of about 20-30%
- The mean corpuscular volume or MCV is usually normal or low for congenital causes of sideroblastic anemia but normal or high for acquired forms.
- With lead poisoning, see coarse basophilic stippling of red blood cells on peripheral blood smear
- Specific test: Prussian blue stain of RBC in marrow shows ringed sideroblasts. Prussian blue staining involves a non-enzymatic reaction of ferrous iron with ferrocyanide forming ferric-ferrocyanide, which is blue in color. A counterstain may be used to provide better visualization.

== Treatment ==
Occasionally, the anemia is so severe that support with transfusion is required. These patients usually do not respond to erythropoietin therapy. Some cases have been reported that the anemia is reversed or heme level is improved through use of moderate to high doses of pyridoxine (vitamin B_{6}). In severe cases of SBA, bone marrow transplant is also an option with limited information about the success rate. Some cases are listed on MedLine and various other medical sites. In the case of isoniazid-induced sideroblastic anemia, the addition of B_{6} is sufficient to correct the anemia. Deferoxamine, a chelating agent, is used to treat iron overload from transfusions. Therapeutic phlebotomy can be used to manage iron overload.

== Prognosis ==
Sideroblastic anemias are often described as responsive or non-responsive in terms of increased hemoglobin levels to pharmacological doses of vitamin B_{6}.

1- Congenital: 80% are responsive, though the anemia does not completely resolve.

2- Acquired clonal: 40% are responsive, but the response may be minimal.

3- Acquired reversible: 60% are responsive, but course depends on treatment of the underlying cause.

Severe refractory sideroblastic anemias requiring regular transfusions and/or that undergo leukemic transformation (5–10%) significantly reduce life expectancy.

== See also ==
- Anemia
- Siderosis
- List of hematologic conditions
- Hematopoietic stem cell transplantation
