= Perls Prussian blue =

Histologic method to stain for iron

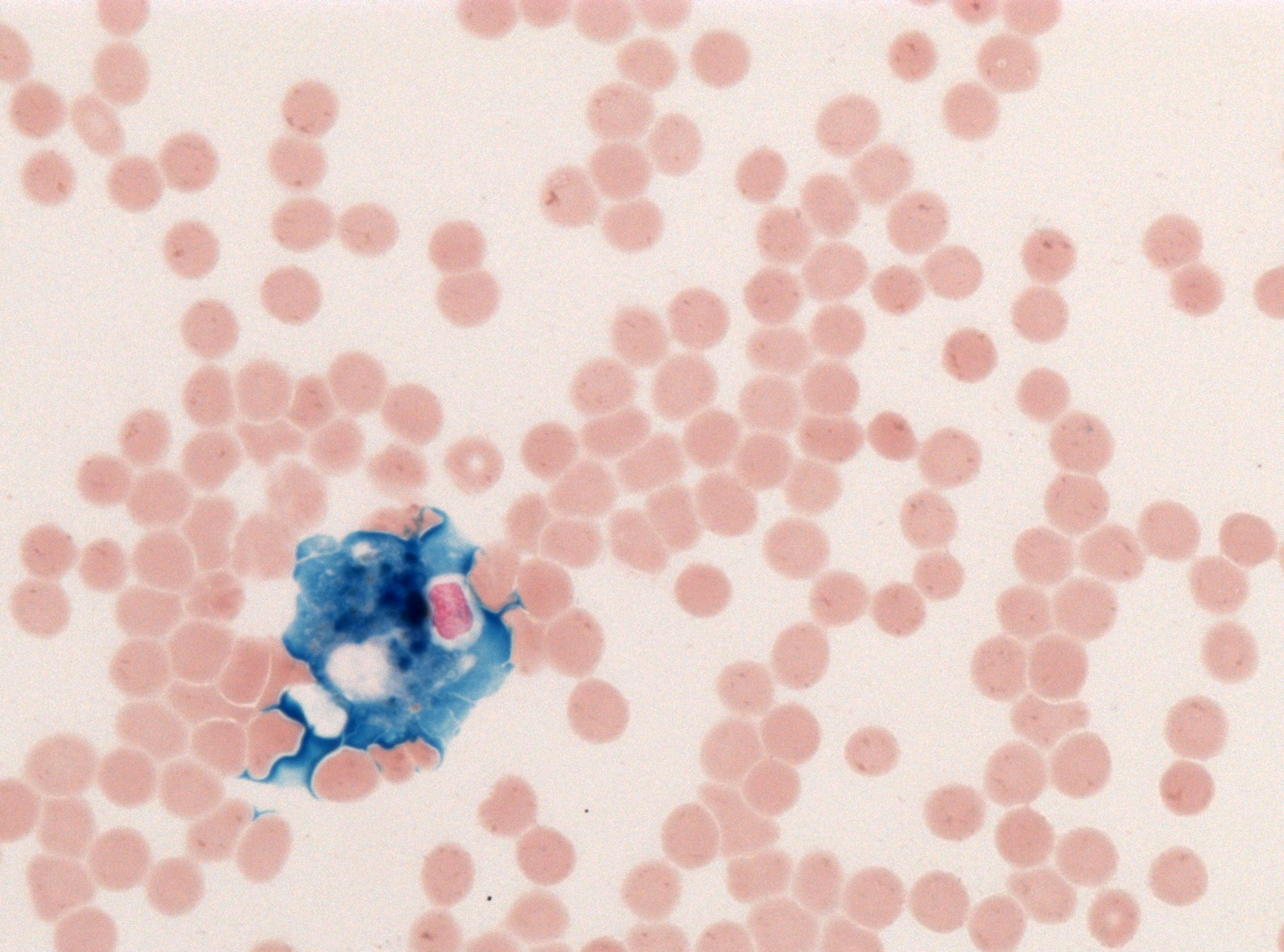
Cerebrospinal fluid specimen stained with Perls Prussian blue showing iron containing macrophage (stained blue) surrounded by erythrocytes (stained red)

In histology, histopathology, and clinical pathology, Perls Prussian blue is a commonly used method to detect the presence of iron in tissue or cell samples. Perls Prussian Blue derives its name from the German pathologist Max Perls (1843–1881), who described the technique in 1867. The method does not involve the application of a dye but rather causes the pigment Prussian blue to form directly within the tissue. The method stains mostly iron in the ferric state which includes ferritin and hemosiderin, rather than iron in the ferrous state.

== Uses ==
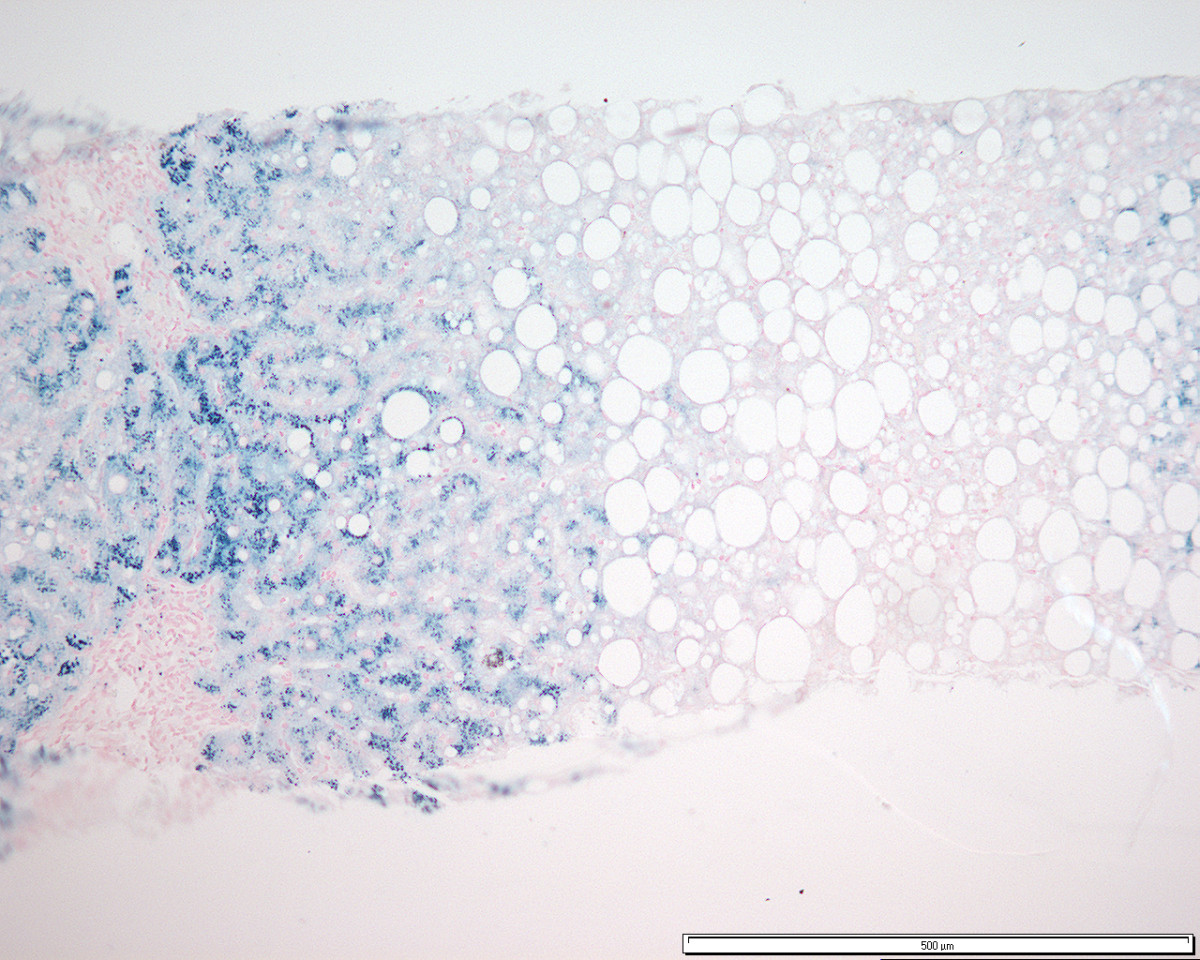
Section of liver stained with Perls Prussian blue, showing iron accumulations (blue) consistent with homozygous genetic hemochromatosis

Perls's method is used to indicate "non-heme" iron in tissues such as ferritin and hemosiderin, the procedure does not stain iron that is bound to porphyrin forming heme such as hemoglobin and myoglobin. The stain is an important histochemical stain used to demonstrate the distribution and amount of iron deposits in liver tissue, often in the form of a biopsy. Perls's procedure may be used to identify excess iron deposits such as hemosiderin deposits (hemosiderosis) and in conditions such as hereditary hemochromatosis. Perls Prussian blue is commonly used on bone marrow aspirates to indicate levels of iron storage and may provide reliable evidence of iron deficiency.

== Method of application ==
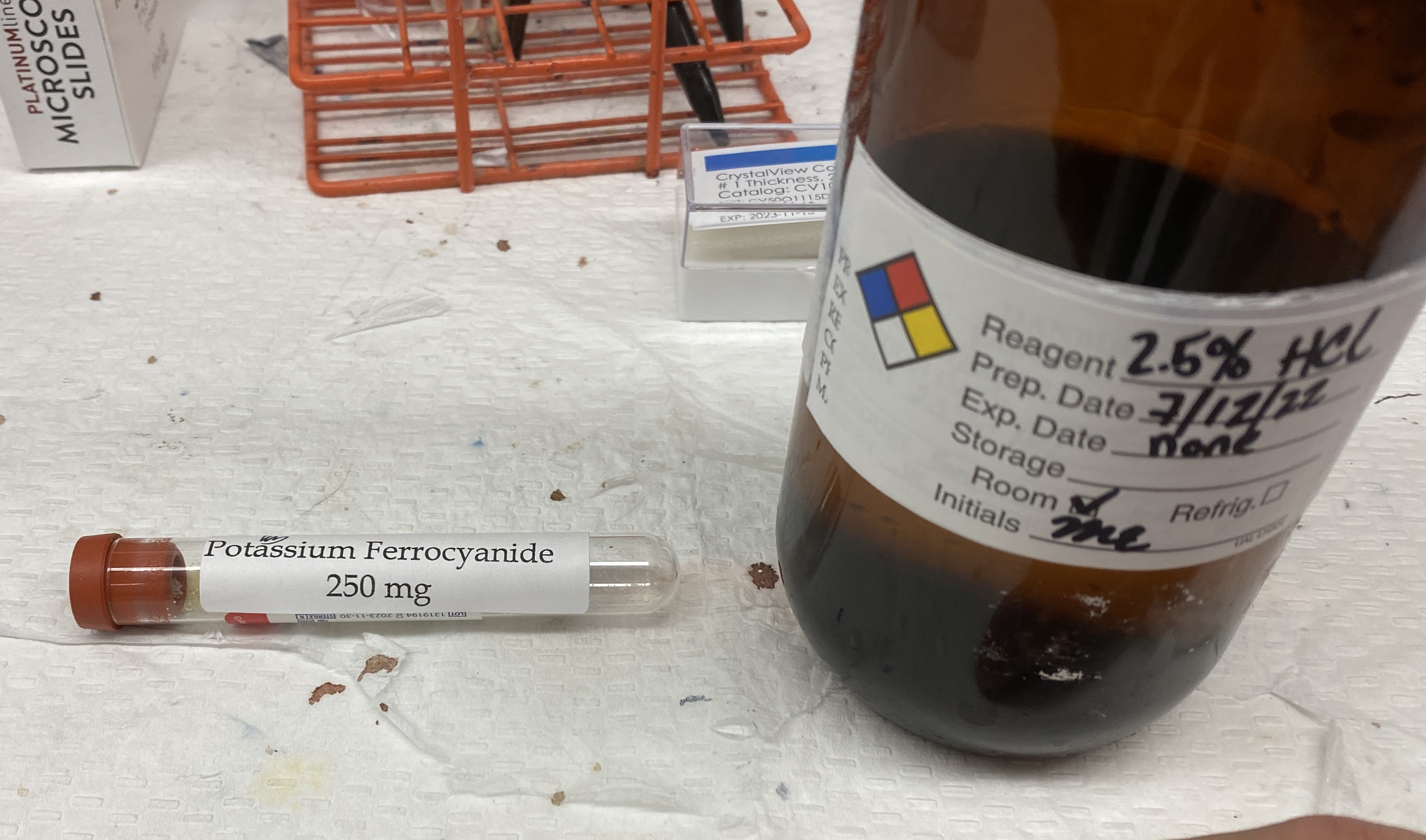
Perls Prussian blue components: potassium ferrocyanide and hydrochloric acid.

Perls did not publish a detailed procedure other than indicating a dilute potassium ferrocyanide solution was applied to the tissue followed by hydrochloric acid. Ferric iron deposits in tissue (present mostly as ferric iron within the storage protein ferritin) then react with the soluble ferrocyanide in the stain to form the insoluble Prussian blue pigment (a complex hydrated ferric ferrocyanide substance). These deposits are then visualizable microscopically as blue or purple deposits.

Many methods of performing Perls Prussian blue stain for iron have been published, Drury and Wallington (1980) give a protocol that uses a mixture of 1 part 2% hydrochloric acid and 1 part 2% potassium ferrocyanide that is applied to the section for 20–30 minutes followed by a rinse in distilled water and application of a counterstain such as eosin, safranin or neutral red.

== Mode of action ==
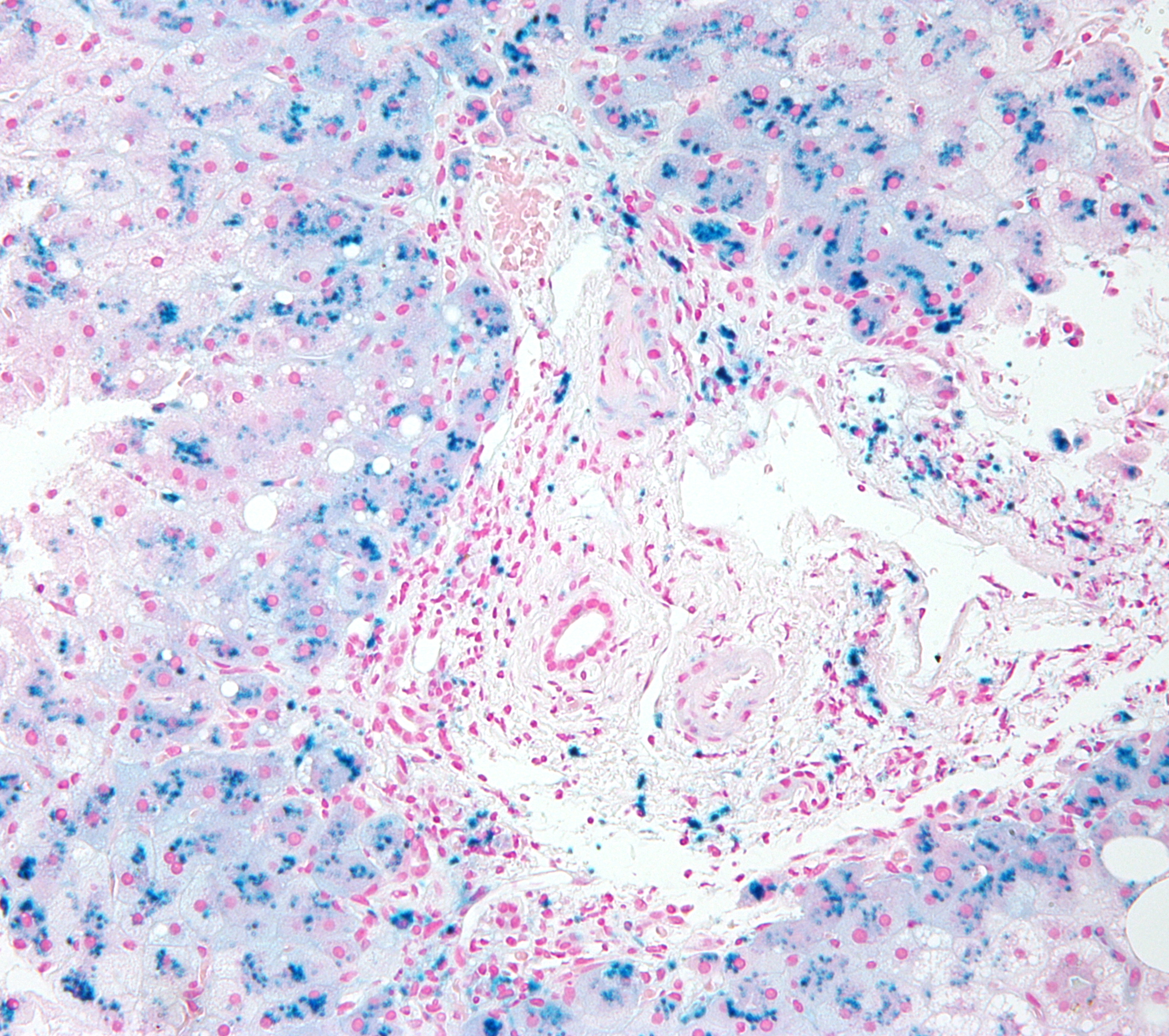
Perls Prussian blue stained section of liver biopsy showing hemosiderosis

Potassium ferrocyanide in the staining solution combines with the ferric iron forming the Prussian blue pigment. The addition of hydrochloric acid increases the availability of iron within the tissue for reaction with the potassium ferrocyanide. The chemical reaction for the conversion of iron to Prussian blue is provided as follows in Drury and Wallington (1980):
4FeCl_{3} + 3K_{4}Fe(CN)_{6} → Fe_{4}[Fe(CN)_{6}]_{3} + 12KCl

(ferric iron) + (potassium ferrocyanide) → (ferric ferrocyanide or Prussian blue)
