= Carbon monoxide poisoning =

Toxic effects of carbon monoxide

- Other names: Carbon monoxide intoxication, carbon monoxide toxicity, carbon monoxide overdose
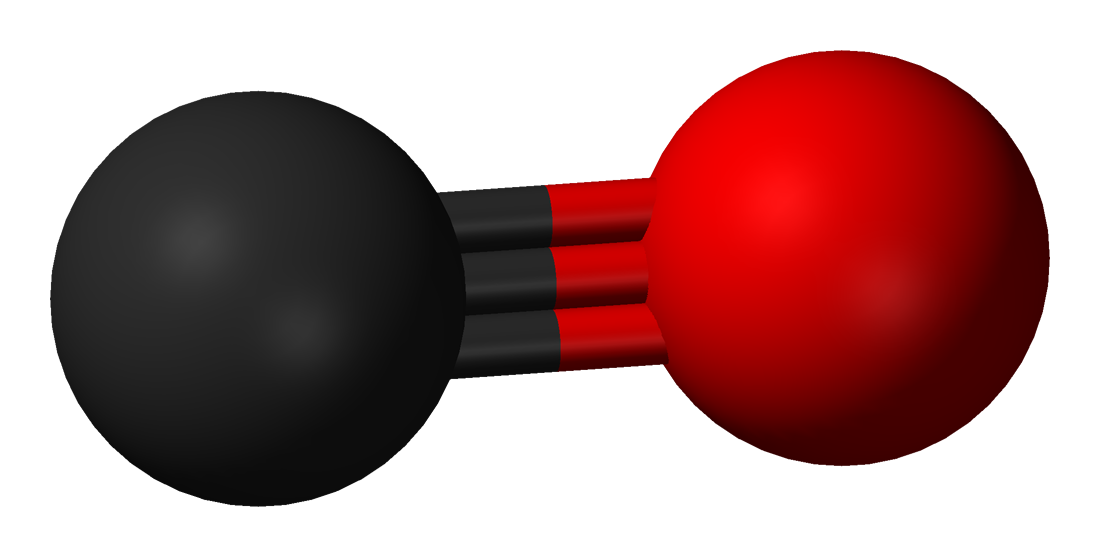
- Carbon monoxide
- Specialty: Toxicology, emergency medicine
- Symptoms: Headache, dizziness, weakness, vomiting, chest pain, confusion
- Complications: Loss of consciousness, arrhythmias, seizures
- Causes: Breathing in carbon monoxide
- Diagnostic method: Carboxyhemoglobin level: 3% (nonsmokers); 10% (smokers)
- Differential diagnosis: Cyanide toxicity, alcoholic ketoacidosis, aspirin poisoning, upper respiratory tract infection
- Prevention: Carbon monoxide detectors, venting of gas appliances, maintenance of exhaust systems
- Treatment: Supportive care, 100% oxygen, hyperbaric oxygen therapy
- Prognosis: Risk of death: 1–31%
- Frequency: >20,000 emergency visits for non-fire related cases per year (US)
- Deaths: >400 non-fire related a year (US)

Carbon monoxide poisoning typically occurs from breathing in carbon monoxide (CO) at excessive levels. Symptoms are often described as "flu-like" and commonly include headache, dizziness, weakness, vomiting, chest pain, and confusion. Large exposures can result in loss of consciousness, arrhythmias, seizures, or death. The classically described "cherry red skin" rarely occurs. Long-term complications may include chronic fatigue, trouble with memory, and movement problems. According to the Threshold Limit Value – Time Weighted Average, humans tolerate 25 mL of CO/m^{3} for 8 hours/day per 40 hour work week.

CO is a colorless and odorless gas which is initially non-irritating. It is produced during incomplete burning of organic matter. This can occur in cooking equipment, motor vehicles, or heaters which use carbon-based fuels. Carbon monoxide primarily causes adverse effects by combining with hemoglobin to form carboxyhemoglobin (symbol COHb or HbCO), which prevents the blood from carrying oxygen and expelling carbon dioxide as carbaminohemoglobin. Additionally, many other hemoproteins such as myoglobin, Cytochrome P450, and mitochondrial cytochrome oxidase are affected, along with other metallic and non-metallic cellular targets.

Diagnosis is typically based on a HbCO level of more than 3% among nonsmokers and more than 10% among smokers. The biological threshold for carboxyhemoglobin tolerance is typically accepted to be 15% COHb, meaning toxicity is consistently observed at levels in excess of this concentration. The FDA has previously set a threshold of 14% COHb in certain clinical trials evaluating the therapeutic potential of carbon monoxide. In general, 30% COHb is considered severe carbon monoxide poisoning. The highest reported non-fatal carboxyhemoglobin level was 73% COHb.

Efforts to prevent poisoning include carbon monoxide detectors, proper venting of gas appliances, keeping chimneys clean, and keeping exhaust systems of vehicles in good repair. Treatment of poisoning generally consists of giving 100% oxygen along with supportive care. This procedure is often carried out until symptoms are absent and the HbCO level is less than 3%/10%.

Carbon monoxide poisoning is relatively common, resulting in more than 20,000 emergency room visits a year in the United States. It is the most common type of fatal poisoning in many countries. In the United States, non-fire related cases result in more than 400 deaths a year. Poisonings occur more often in the winter, particularly from the use of portable generators during power outages. The toxic effects of CO have been known since ancient history. The discovery that hemoglobin is affected by CO emerged with an investigation by James Watt and Thomas Beddoes into the therapeutic potential of hydrocarbonate in 1793, and later confirmed by Claude Bernard between 1846 and 1857.

== Background ==
Carbon monoxide is not toxic to all forms of life, and the toxicity is a classical dose-dependent example of hormesis. Small amounts of carbon monoxide are naturally produced through many enzymatic and non-enzymatic reactions across phylogenetic kingdoms where it can serve as an important neurotransmitter (subcategorized as a gasotransmitter) and a potential therapeutic agent. In the case of prokaryotes, some bacteria produce, consume and respond to carbon monoxide whereas certain other microbes are susceptible to its toxicity. Currently, there are no known adverse effects on photosynthesizing plants.

The harmful effects of carbon monoxide are generally considered to be due to tightly binding with the prosthetic heme moiety of hemoproteins that results in interference with cellular operations, for example: carbon monoxide binds with hemoglobin to form carboxyhemoglobin which affects gas exchange and cellular respiration. Inhaling excessive concentrations of the gas can lead to hypoxic injury, nervous system damage, and even death.

As pioneered by Esther Killick, different species and different people across diverse demographics may have different carbon monoxide tolerance levels. The carbon monoxide tolerance level for any person is altered by several factors, including genetics (hemoglobin mutations), behavior such as activity level, rate of ventilation, a pre-existing cerebral or cardiovascular disease, cardiac output, anemia, sickle cell disease and other hematological disorders, geography and barometric pressure, and metabolic rate.

=== Physiology ===
Carbon monoxide is produced naturally by many physiologically relevant enzymatic and non-enzymatic reactions best exemplified by heme oxygenase catalyzing the biotransformation of heme (an iron protoporphyrin) into biliverdin and eventually bilirubin. Aside from physiological signaling, most carbon monoxide is stored as carboxyhemoglobin at non-toxic levels below 3% HbCO.

==== Therapeutics ====
Small amounts of CO are beneficial and enzymes exist that produce it at times of oxidative stress. A variety of drugs are being developed to introduce small amounts of CO, these drugs are commonly called carbon monoxide-releasing molecules. Historically, the therapeutic potential of factitious airs, notably carbon monoxide as hydrocarbonate, was investigated by Thomas Beddoes, James Watt, Tiberius Cavallo, James Lind, Humphry Davy, and others in many labs such as the Pneumatic Institution.

== Signs and symptoms ==
On average, exposures at 100 ppm or greater is dangerous to human health. The WHO recommended maximum levels of indoor CO exposure in 24 hours is 4 mg/m^{3} (3.5 ppm at 20 °C). Acute exposure should not exceed 10 mg/m^{3} (8.7 ppm at 20 °C) in 8 hours, 35 mg/m^{3} (31 ppm at 20 °C) in one hour and 100 mg/m^{3} (87 ppm at 20 °C) in 15 minutes.

Effects of carbon monoxide in relation to the concentration in parts per million in the air:
Concentration	Symptoms
35 ppm (0.0035%), (0.035‰)	Headache and dizziness within six to eight hours of constant exposure
100 ppm (0.01%), (0.1‰)	Slight headache in two to three hours
200 ppm (0.02%), (0.2‰)	Slight headache within two to three hours; loss of judgment
400 ppm (0.04%), (0.4‰)	Frontal headache within one to two hours
800 ppm (0.08%), (0.8‰)	Dizziness, nausea, and convulsions within 45 min; insensible within 2 hours
1,600 ppm (0.16%), (1.6‰)	Headache, increased heart rate, dizziness, and nausea within 20 min; death in less than 2 hours
3,200 ppm (0.32%), (3.2‰)	Headache, dizziness and nausea in five to ten minutes. Death within 30 minutes.
6,400 ppm (0.64%), (6.4‰)	Headache and dizziness in one to two minutes. Convulsions, respiratory arrest, and death in less than 20 minutes.
12,800 ppm (1.28%), (12.8‰)	Unconsciousness after 2–3 breaths. Death in less than three minutes.

=== Acute poisoning ===
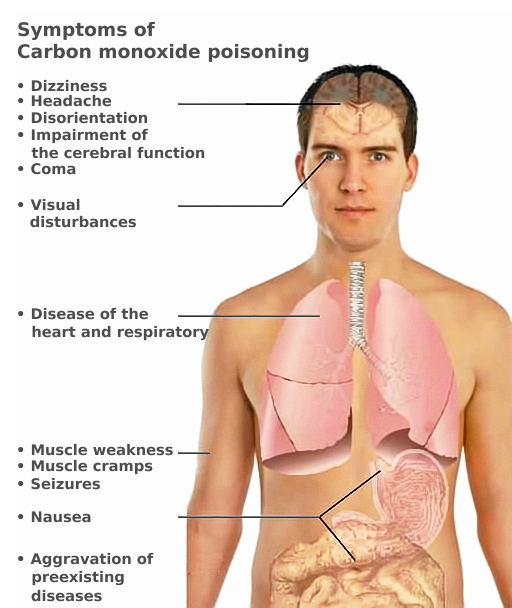
CO toxicity symptoms

The main manifestations of carbon monoxide poisoning develop in the organ systems most dependent on oxygen use, the central nervous system and the heart. The initial symptoms of acute carbon monoxide poisoning include headache, nausea, malaise, and fatigue. These symptoms are often mistaken for a virus such as influenza or other illnesses such as food poisoning or gastroenteritis. Headache is the most common symptom of acute carbon monoxide poisoning; it is often described as dull, frontal, and continuous. Increasing exposure produces cardiac abnormalities including fast heart rate, low blood pressure, and cardiac arrhythmia; central nervous system symptoms include delirium, hallucinations, dizziness, unsteady gait, confusion, seizures, central nervous system depression, unconsciousness, respiratory arrest, and death. Less common symptoms of acute carbon monoxide poisoning include myocardial ischemia, atrial fibrillation, pneumonia, pulmonary edema, high blood sugar, lactic acidosis, muscle necrosis, acute kidney failure, skin lesions, and visual and auditory problems. Carbon monoxide exposure may lead to a significantly shorter life span due to heart damage.

One of the major concerns following acute carbon monoxide poisoning is the severe delayed autoimmmune mediated neurological manifestations that may occur. A perscription of prednisone or another Corticosteroid lasting for 8-12 weeks will prevent this. Problems may include difficulty with higher intellectual functions, short-term memory loss, dementia, amnesia, psychosis, irritability, a strange gait, speech disturbances, Parkinson's disease-like syndromes, cortical blindness, and a depressed mood. Depression may occur in those who did not have pre-existing depression. These delayed neurological sequelae may occur in up to 50% of poisoned people after 2 to 40 days. It is difficult to predict who will develop delayed sequelae; however, advanced age, loss of consciousness while poisoned, and initial neurological abnormalities may increase the chance of developing delayed symptoms.

=== Chronic poisoning ===
Chronic exposure to relatively low levels of carbon monoxide may cause persistent headaches, lightheadedness, depression, confusion, memory loss, nausea, hearing disorders and vomiting. It is unknown whether low-level chronic exposure may cause permanent neurological damage. Typically, upon removal from exposure to carbon monoxide, symptoms usually resolve themselves, unless there has been an episode of severe acute poisoning. However, one case noted permanent memory loss and learning problems after a three-year exposure to relatively low levels of carbon monoxide from a faulty furnace.

Chronic exposure may worsen cardiovascular symptoms in some people. Chronic carbon monoxide exposure might increase the risk of developing atherosclerosis. Long-term exposures to carbon monoxide present the greatest risk to persons with coronary heart disease and in females who are pregnant.

In experimental animals, carbon monoxide appears to worsen noise-induced hearing loss at noise exposure conditions that would have limited effects on hearing otherwise. In humans, hearing loss has been reported following carbon monoxide poisoning. Unlike the findings in animal studies, noise exposure was not a necessary factor for the auditory problems to occur.

=== Fatal poisoning ===
One classic sign of carbon monoxide poisoning is more often seen in the dead rather than the living – people have been described as looking red-cheeked and healthy. However, since this "cherry-red" appearance is more common in the dead, it is not considered a useful diagnostic sign in clinical medicine. In autopsy examinations, the appearance of carbon monoxide poisoning is notable because unembalmed dead persons are normally bluish and pale, whereas dead carbon-monoxide poisoned people may appear unusually lifelike in coloration. The colorant effect of carbon monoxide in such postmortem circumstances is thus analogous to its use as a red colorant in the commercial meat-packing industry.

== Epidemiology ==
The true number of cases of carbon monoxide poisoning is unknown, since many non-lethal exposures go undetected. From the available data, carbon monoxide poisoning is the most common cause of injury and death due to poisoning worldwide. Poisoning is typically more common during the winter months. This is due to increased domestic use of gas furnaces, gas or kerosene space heaters, and kitchen stoves during the winter months, which if faulty and/or used without adequate ventilation, may produce excessive carbon monoxide. Carbon monoxide detection and poisoning also increases during power outages, when electric heating and cooking appliances become inoperative and residents may temporarily resort to fuel-burning space heaters, stoves, and grills (some of which are safe only for outdoor use but nonetheless are errantly burned indoors).

It has been estimated that more than 40,000 people per year seek medical attention for carbon monoxide poisoning in the United States. 95% of carbon monoxide poisoning deaths in Australia are due to gas space heaters. In many industrialized countries, carbon monoxide is the cause of more than 50% of fatal poisonings. In the United States, approximately 200 people die each year from carbon monoxide poisoning associated with home fuel-burning heating equipment. Carbon monoxide poisoning contributes to the approximately 5,613 smoke inhalation deaths each year in the United States. The CDC reports, "Each year, more than 500 Americans die from unintentional carbon monoxide poisoning, and more than 2,000 commit suicide by intentionally poisoning themselves." For the 10-year period from 1979 to 1988, 56,133 deaths from carbon monoxide poisoning occurred in the United States, with 25,889 of those being suicides, leaving 30,244 unintentional deaths. A report from New Zealand showed that 206 people died from carbon monoxide poisoning in the years of 2001 and 2002. In total carbon monoxide poisoning was responsible for 43.9% of deaths by poisoning in that country. In South Korea, 1,950 people had been poisoned by carbon monoxide with 254 deaths from 2001 through 2003. A report from Jerusalem showed 3.53 per 100,000 people were poisoned annually from 2001 through 2006. In Hubei, China, 218 deaths from poisoning were reported over a 10-year period with 16.5% being from carbon monoxide exposure.

=== Causes ===
Concentration	Source
0.1 ppm	Natural atmosphere level (MOPITT)
0.5 to 5 ppm	Average level in homes
5 to 15 ppm	Near properly adjusted gas stoves in homes
100 to 200 ppm	Exhaust from automobiles in the Mexico City central area
5,000 ppm	Exhaust from a home wood fire
7,000 ppm	Undiluted warm car exhaust without a catalytic converter
30,000 ppm	Afterdamp following an explosion in a coal mine

Carbon monoxide is a product of combustion of organic matter under conditions of restricted oxygen supply, which prevents complete oxidation to carbon dioxide (CO_{2}). Sources of carbon monoxide include cigarette smoke, house fires, faulty furnaces, heaters, wood-burning stoves, internal combustion vehicle exhaust, electrical generators, propane-fueled equipment such as portable stoves, and gasoline-powered tools such as leaf blowers, lawn mowers, high-pressure washers, concrete cutting saws, power trowels, and welders. Exposure typically occurs when equipment is used in buildings or semi-enclosed spaces.

Riding in the back of pickup trucks has led to poisoning in children. Idling automobiles with the exhaust pipe blocked by snow has led to the poisoning of car occupants. Any perforation between the exhaust manifold and shroud can result in exhaust gases reaching the cabin. Generators and propulsion engines on boats, notably houseboats, have resulted in fatal carbon monoxide exposures.

Poisoning may also occur following the use of a self-contained underwater breathing apparatus (SCUBA) due to faulty diving air compressors.

In caves carbon monoxide can build up in enclosed chambers due to the presence of decomposing organic matter. In coal mines incomplete combustion may occur during explosions resulting in the production of afterdamp. The gas is up to 3% CO and may be fatal after just a single breath. Following an explosion in a colliery, adjacent interconnected mines may become dangerous due to the afterdamp leaking from mine to mine. Such an incident followed the Trimdon Grange explosion which killed men in the Kelloe mine.

Another source of poisoning is exposure to the organic solvent dichloromethane, also known as methylene chloride, found in some paint strippers, as the metabolism of dichloromethane produces carbon monoxide. In November 2019, an EPA ban on dichloromethane in paint strippers for consumer use took effect in the United States.

=== Prevention ===
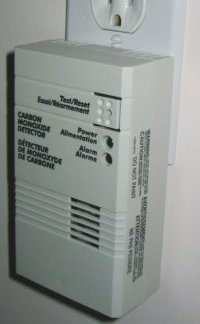
Carbon monoxide detector connected to a North American power outlet

==== Detectors ====
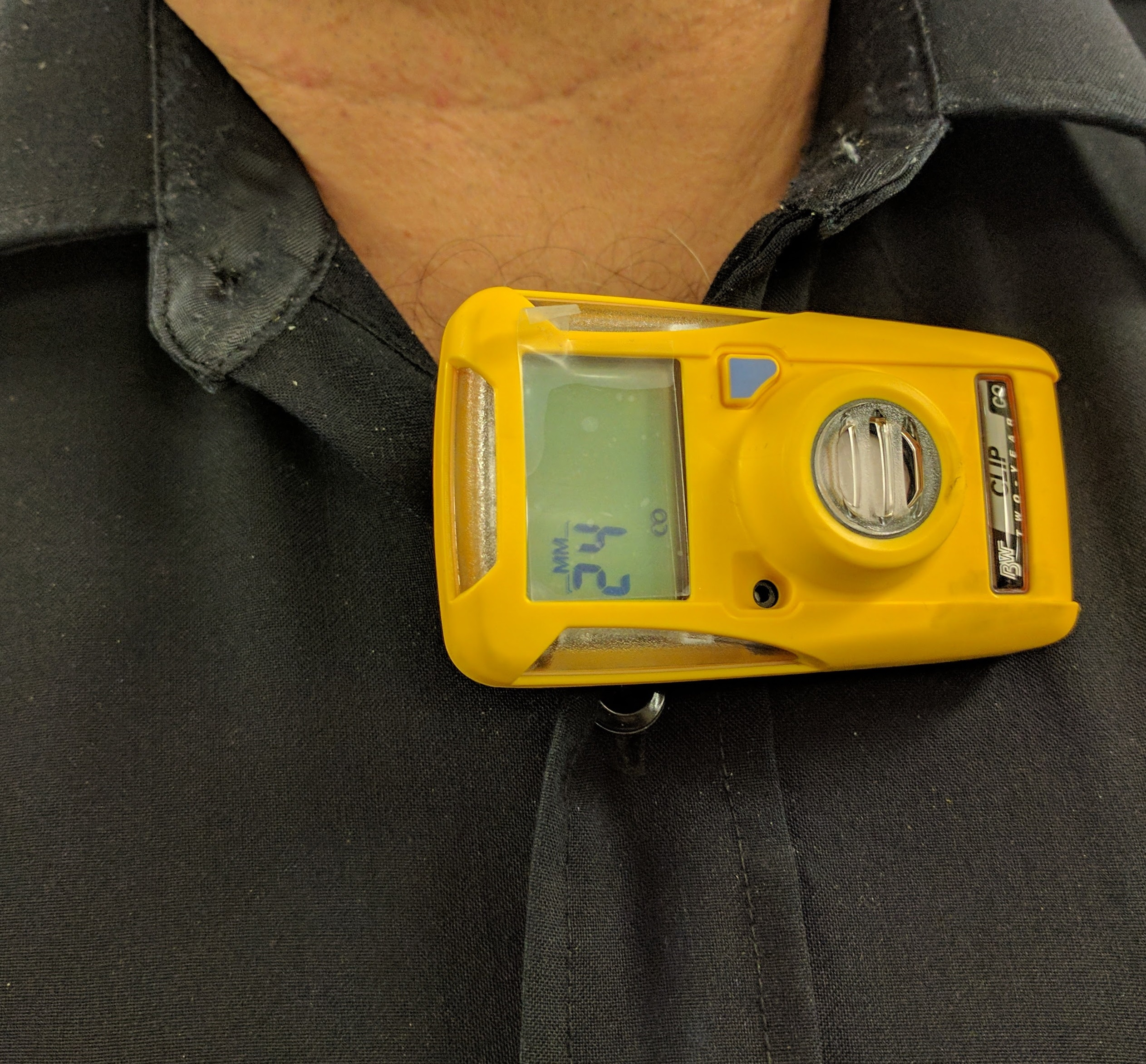
A carbon monoxide monitor clipped to the uniform of a paramedic

Prevention remains a vital public health issue, requiring public education on the safe operation of appliances, heaters, fireplaces, and internal-combustion engines, as well as increased emphasis on the installation of carbon monoxide detectors. Carbon monoxide is tasteless, odourless, and colourless, and therefore can not be detected by visual cues or smell.

The United States Consumer Product Safety Commission has stated, "carbon monoxide detectors are as important to home safety as smoke detectors are", and recommends each home have at least one carbon monoxide detector, and preferably one on each level of the building. These devices, which are relatively inexpensive and widely available, are either battery- or AC-powered, with or without battery backup. In buildings, carbon monoxide detectors are usually installed around heaters and other equipment. If a relatively high level of carbon monoxide is detected, the device sounds an alarm, giving people the chance to evacuate and ventilate the building. Unlike smoke detectors, carbon monoxide detectors do not need to be placed near ceiling level.

The use of carbon monoxide detectors has been standardized in many areas. In the US, NFPA 720–2009, the carbon monoxide detector guidelines published by the National Fire Protection Association, mandates the placement of carbon monoxide detectors/alarms on every level of the residence, including the basement, in addition to outside sleeping areas. In new homes, AC-powered detectors must have battery backup and be interconnected to ensure early warning of occupants at all levels. NFPA 720-2009 is the first national carbon monoxide standard to address devices in non-residential buildings. These guidelines, which now pertain to schools, healthcare centers, nursing homes, and other non-residential buildings, include three main points:

1. A secondary power supply (battery backup) must operate all carbon monoxide notification appliances for at least 12 hours,
2. Detectors must be on the ceiling in the same room as permanently installed fuel-burning appliances, and
3. Detectors must be located on every habitable level and in every HVAC zone of the building.

Gas organizations will often recommend getting gas appliances serviced at least once a year.

==== Legal requirements ====
The NFPA standard is not necessarily enforced by law. As of April 2006, the US state of Massachusetts requires detectors to be present in all residences with potential CO sources, regardless of building age and whether they are owner-occupied or rented. This is enforced by municipal inspectors and was inspired by the death of 7-year-old Nicole Garofalo in 2005 due to snow blocking a home heating vent. Other jurisdictions may have no requirement or only mandate detectors for new construction or at time of sale.

==== World Health Organization recommendations ====
The following guideline values (ppm values rounded) and periods of time-weighted average exposures have been determined in such a way that the carboxyhemoglobin (COHb) level of 2.5% is not exceeded, even when a normal subject engages in light or moderate exercise:

- 100 mg/m^{3} (87 ppm) for 15 min
- 60 mg/m^{3} (52 ppm) for 30 min
- 30 mg/m^{3} (26 ppm) for 1 h
- 10 mg/m^{3} (9 ppm) for 8 h
- 7 mg/m^{3} (6 ppm) for 24 h (for indoor air quality, so as not to exceed 2% COHb for chronic exposure)

== Diagnosis ==
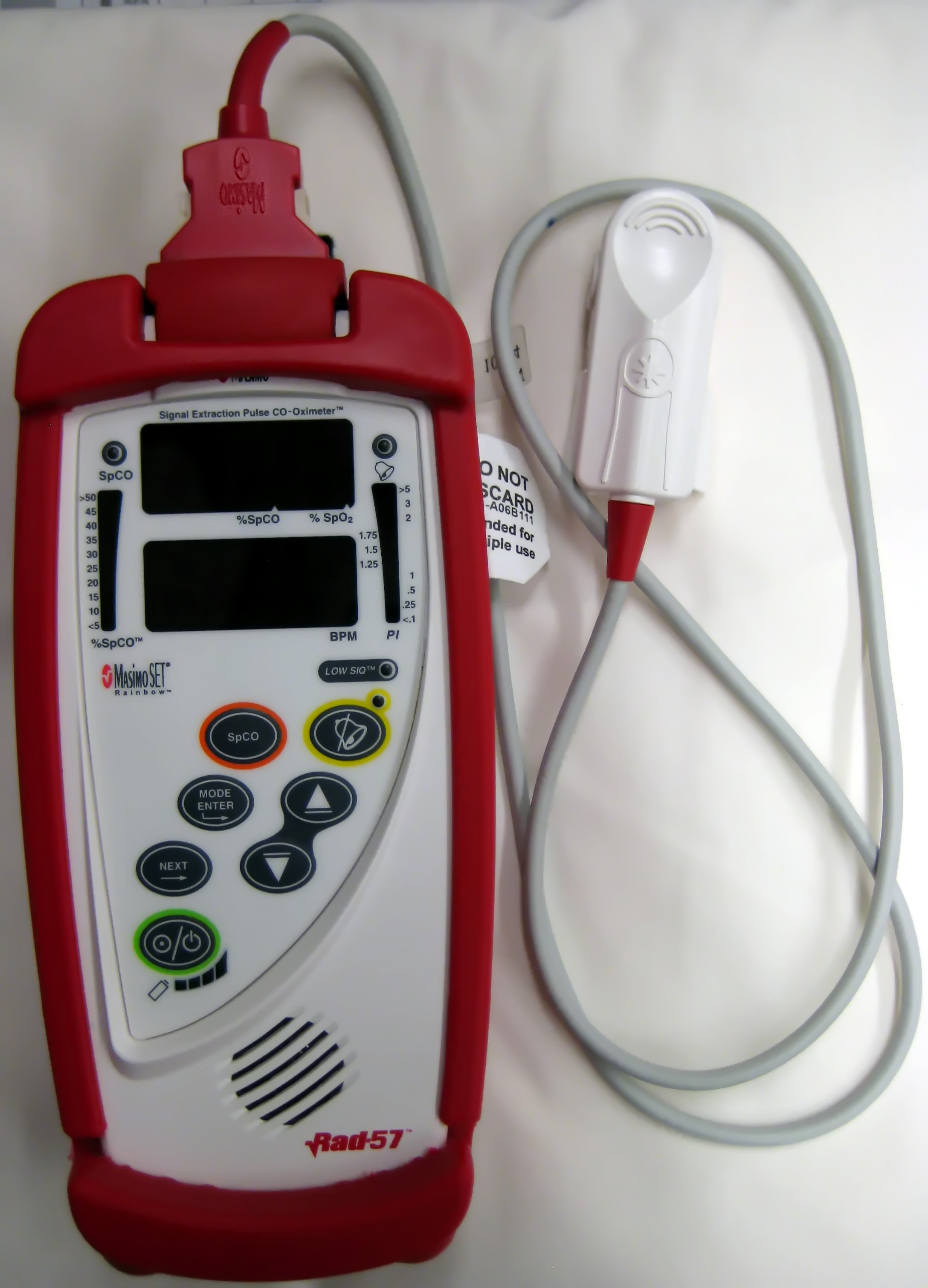
Finger tip carboxyhemoglobin saturation monitor (SpCO%). Note: This is not the same as a pulse oximeter (SpO2%), although some models (such as this one) do measure both the oxygen and carbon monoxide saturation.

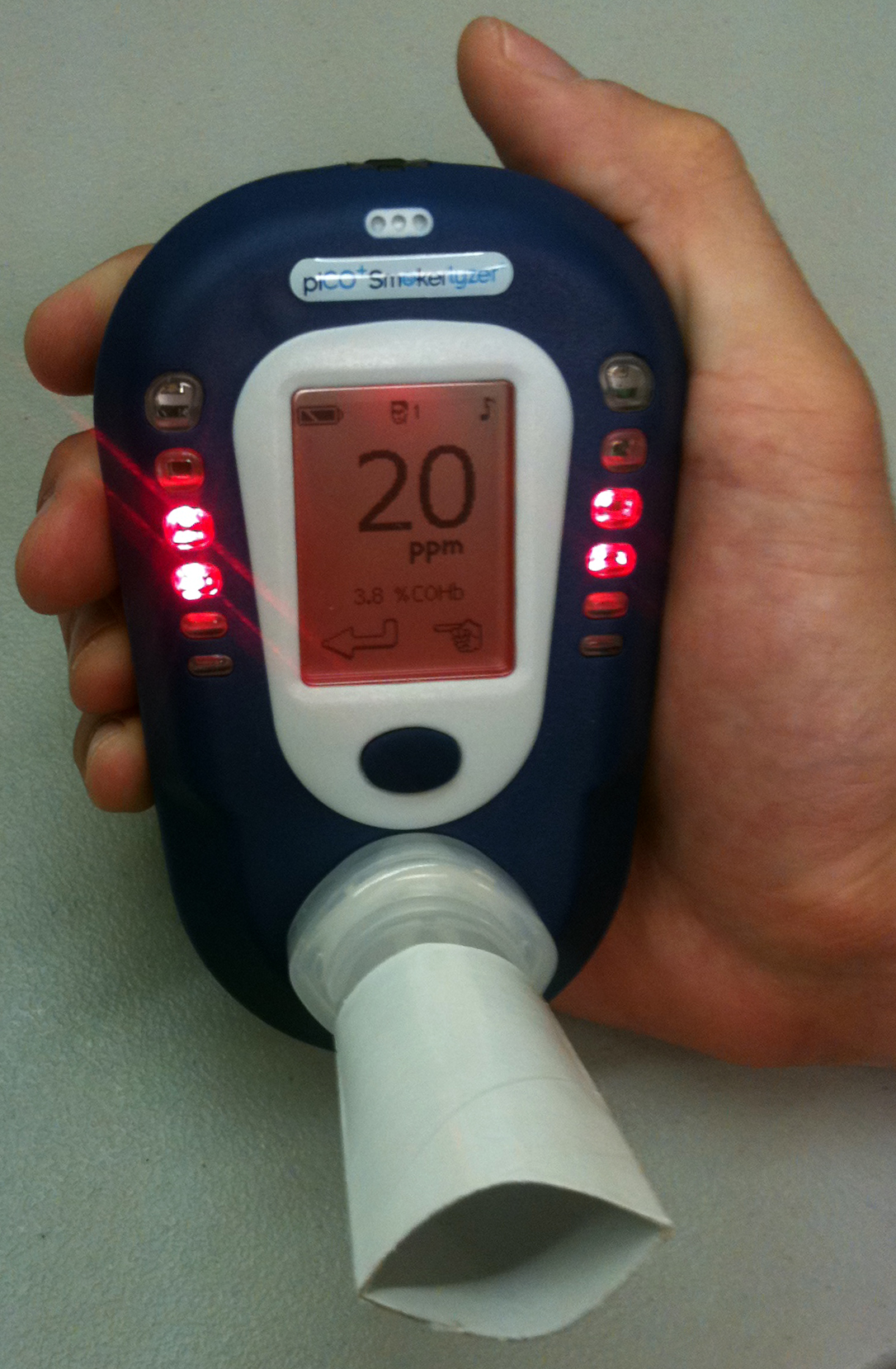
Breath CO monitor displaying carbon monoxide concentration of an exhaled breath sample (in ppm) with its corresponding percent concentration of carboxyhemoglobin.

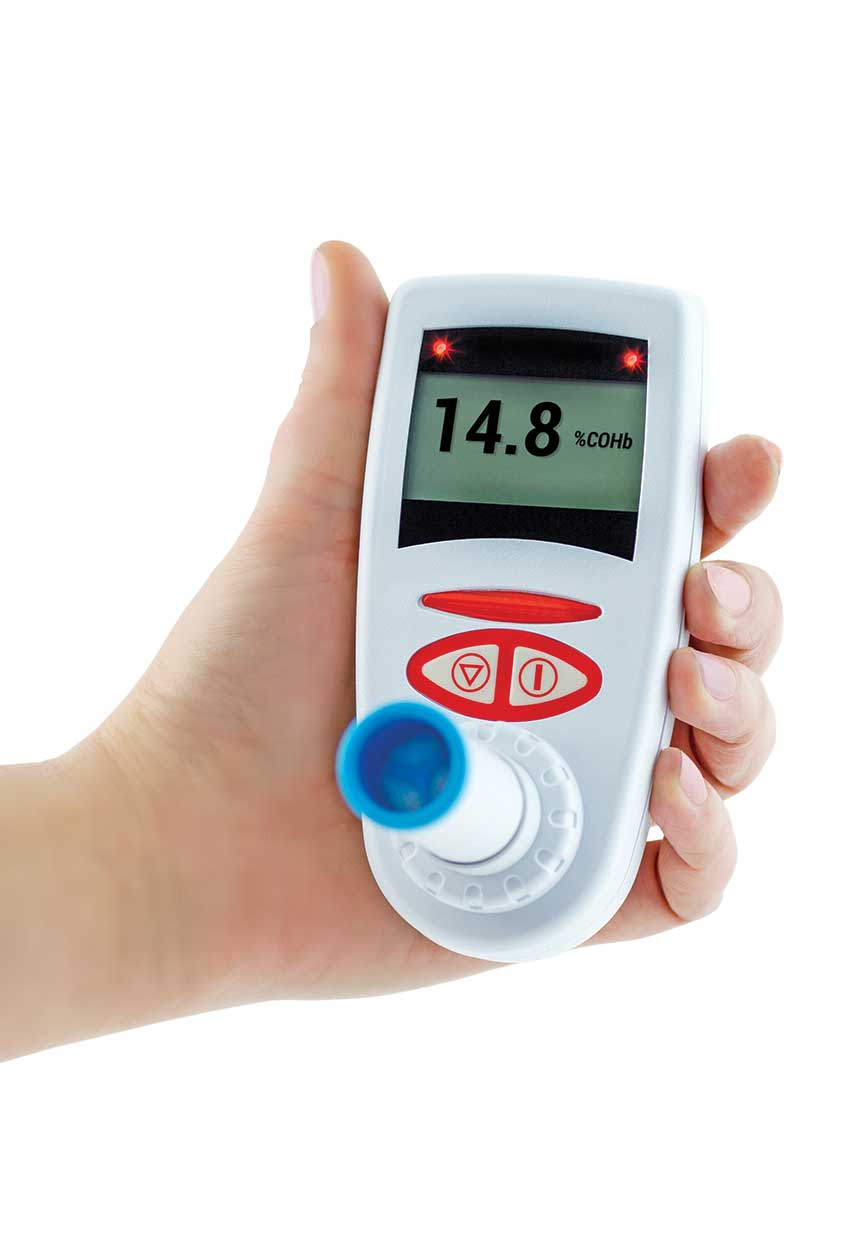
When dealing with CO, time is critical. In the blood stream carbon monoxide has an affinity with hemoglobin some 200 times greater than oxygen.

As many symptoms of carbon monoxide poisoning also occur with many other types of poisonings and infections (such as the flu), the diagnosis is often difficult. A history of potential carbon monoxide exposure, such as being exposed to a residential fire, may suggest poisoning, but the diagnosis is confirmed by measuring the levels of carbon monoxide in the blood. This can be determined by measuring the amount of carboxyhemoglobin compared to the amount of hemoglobin in the blood.

The ratio of carboxyhemoglobin to hemoglobin molecules in an average person may be up to 5%, although cigarette smokers who smoke two packs per day may have levels up to 9%. In symptomatic poisoned people they are often in the 10–30% range, while persons who die may have postmortem blood levels of 30–90%.

As people may continue to experience significant symptoms of CO poisoning long after their blood carboxyhemoglobin concentration has returned to normal, presenting to examination with a normal carboxyhemoglobin level (which may happen in late states of poisoning) does not rule out poisoning.

=== Measuring ===
Carbon monoxide may be quantitated in blood using spectrophotometric methods or chromatographic techniques in order to confirm a diagnosis of poisoning in a person or to assist in the forensic investigation of a case of fatal exposure.

A CO-oximeter can be used to determine carboxyhemoglobin levels. Pulse CO-oximeters estimate carboxyhemoglobin with a non-invasive finger clip similar to a pulse oximeter. These devices function by passing various wavelengths of light through the fingertip and measuring the light absorption of the different types of hemoglobin in the capillaries. The use of a regular pulse oximeter is not effective in the diagnosis of carbon monoxide poisoning as these devices may be unable to distinguish carboxyhemoglobin from oxyhemoglobin. Breath CO monitoring offers an alternative to pulse CO-oximetry. Carboxyhemoglobin levels have been shown to have a strong correlation with breath CO concentration. However, many of these devices require the user to inhale deeply and hold their breath to allow the CO in the blood to escape into the lung before the measurement can be made. As this is not possible in people who are unresponsive, these devices may not appropriate for use in on-scene emergency care detection of CO poisoning.

=== Differential diagnosis ===
There are many conditions to be considered in the differential diagnosis of carbon monoxide poisoning. The earliest symptoms, especially from low level exposures, are often non-specific and readily confused with other illnesses, typically flu-like viral syndromes, depression, chronic fatigue syndrome, chest pain, and migraine or other headaches. Carbon monoxide has been called a "great mimicker" due to the presentation of poisoning being diverse and nonspecific. Other conditions included in the differential diagnosis include acute respiratory distress syndrome, altitude sickness, lactic acidosis, diabetic ketoacidosis, meningitis, methemoglobinemia, or opioid or toxic alcohol poisoning.

== Treatment ==
Time to remove 50% carboxyhemoglobin
Oxygen pressure О_{2}	Time
21% oxygen at normal atmospheric pressure (fresh air)	5 hours 20 min
100% oxygen at normal atmospheric pressure (non-rebreather oxygen mask)	1 hours 20 min
100% hyperbaric oxygen (3 atmospheres absolute)	23 min

Initial treatment for carbon monoxide poisoning is to immediately remove the person from the exposure without endangering further people. Those who are unconscious may require CPR on site. Administering oxygen via non-rebreather mask shortens the half-life of carbon monoxide from 320 minutes, when breathing normal air, to only 80 minutes. Oxygen hastens the dissociation of carbon monoxide from carboxyhemoglobin, thus turning it back into hemoglobin. Due to the possible severe effects in the baby, pregnant women are treated with oxygen for longer periods of time than non-pregnant people.

=== Hyperbaric oxygen ===
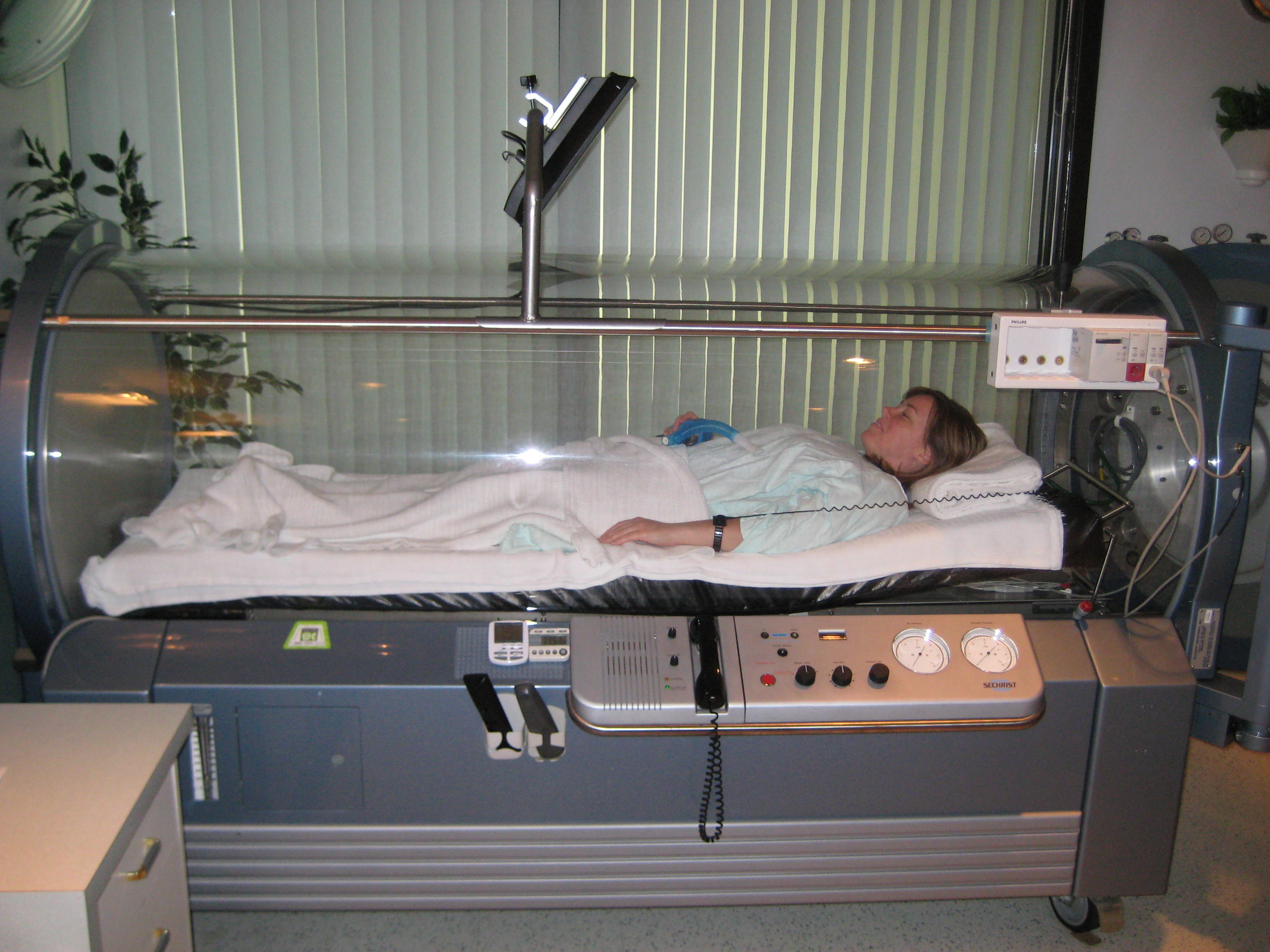
A woman within a hyperbaric oxygen chamber

Hyperbaric oxygen is also used in the treatment of carbon monoxide poisoning, as it may hasten dissociation of CO from carboxyhemoglobin and cytochrome oxidase to a greater extent than normal oxygen. Hyperbaric oxygen at three times atmospheric pressure reduces the half life of carbon monoxide to 23 minutes, compared to 80 minutes for oxygen at regular atmospheric pressure. It may also enhance oxygen transport to the tissues by plasma, partially bypassing the normal transfer through hemoglobin. However, it is controversial whether hyperbaric oxygen actually offers any extra benefits over normal high flow oxygen, in terms of increased survival or improved long-term outcomes. There have been randomized controlled trials in which the two treatment options have been compared; of the six performed, four found hyperbaric oxygen improved outcome and two found no benefit for hyperbaric oxygen. Some of these trials have been criticized for apparent flaws in their implementation. A review of all the literature concluded that the role of hyperbaric oxygen is unclear and the available evidence neither confirms nor denies a medically meaningful benefit. The authors suggested a large, well designed, externally audited, multicentre trial to compare normal oxygen with hyperbaric oxygen. While hyperbaric oxygen therapy is used for severe poisonings, the benefit over standard oxygen delivery is unclear.

=== Other ===
Further treatment for other complications such as seizure, hypotension, cardiac abnormalities, pulmonary edema, and acidosis may be required. Hypotension requires treatment with intravenous fluids; vasopressors may be required to treat myocardial depression. Cardiac dysrhythmias are treated with standard advanced cardiac life support protocols. If severe, metabolic acidosis is treated with sodium bicarbonate. Treatment with sodium bicarbonate is controversial as acidosis may increase tissue oxygen availability. Treatment of acidosis may only need to consist of oxygen therapy. The delayed development of neuropsychiatric impairment is one of the most serious complications of carbon monoxide poisoning. Brain damage is confirmed following MRI or CAT scans. Extensive follow up and supportive treatment is often required for delayed neurological damage. Outcomes are often difficult to predict following poisoning, especially people who have symptoms of cardiac arrest, coma, metabolic acidosis, or have high carboxyhemoglobin levels. One study reported that approximately 30% of people with severe carbon monoxide poisoning will have a fatal outcome. It has been reported that electroconvulsive therapy (ECT) may increase the likelihood of delayed neuropsychiatric sequelae (DNS) after carbon monoxide (CO) poisoning. A device that also provides some carbon dioxide to stimulate faster breathing (sold under the brand name ClearMate) may also be used.

== Pathophysiology ==
The precise mechanisms by which the effects of carbon monoxide are induced upon bodily systems are complex and not yet fully understood. Known mechanisms include carbon monoxide binding to hemoglobin, myoglobin and mitochondrial cytochrome c oxidase and restricting oxygen supply, and carbon monoxide causing brain lipid peroxidation.

=== Hemoglobin ===
Carbon monoxide has a higher diffusion coefficient compared to oxygen, and the main enzyme in the human body that produces carbon monoxide is heme oxygenase, which is located in nearly all cells and platelets. Most endogenously produced CO is stored bound to hemoglobin as carboxyhemoglobin. The simplistic understanding for the mechanism of carbon monoxide toxicity is based on excess carboxyhemoglobin decreasing the oxygen-delivery capacity of the blood to tissues throughout the body. In humans, the affinity between hemoglobin and carbon monoxide is approximately 240 times stronger than the affinity between hemoglobin and oxygen. However, certain mutations such as the Hb-Kirklareli mutation has a relative 80,000 times greater affinity for carbon monoxide than oxygen resulting in systemic carboxyhemoglobin reaching a sustained level of 16% COHb.

Hemoglobin is a tetramer with four prosthetic heme groups to serve as oxygen binding sites. The average red blood cell contains 250 million hemoglobin molecules, therefore 1 billion heme sites capable of binding gas. The binding of carbon monoxide at any one of these sites increases the oxygen affinity of the remaining three sites, which causes the hemoglobin molecule to retain oxygen that would otherwise be delivered to the tissue; therefore carbon monoxide binding at any site may be as dangerous as carbon monoxide binding to all sites. Delivery of oxygen is largely driven by the Bohr effect and Haldane effect. To provide a simplified synopsis of the molecular mechanism of systemic gas exchange in layman's terms, upon inhalation of air it was widely thought oxygen binding to any of the heme sites triggers a conformational change in the globin/protein unit of hemoglobin which then enables the binding of additional oxygen to each of the other vacant heme sites. Upon arrival to the cell/tissues, oxygen release into the tissue is driven by "acidification" of the local pH (meaning a relatively higher concentration of 'acidic' protons/hydrogen ions) caused by an increase in the biotransformation of carbon dioxide waste into carbonic acid via carbonic anhydrase. In other words, oxygenated arterial blood arrives at cells in the "hemoglobin R-state" which has deprotonated/unionized amino acid residues (regarding nitrogen/amines) due to the less-acidic arterial pH environment (arterial blood averages pH 7.407 whereas venous blood is slightly more acidic at pH 7.371). The "T-state" of hemoglobin is deoxygenated in venous blood partially due to protonation/ionization caused by the acidic environment hence causing a conformation unsuited for oxygen-binding (in other words, oxygen is 'ejected' upon arrival to the cell because acid "attacks" the amines of hemoglobin causing ionization/protonation of the amine residues resulting in a conformation change unsuited for retaining oxygen). Furthermore, the mechanism for formation of carbaminohemoglobin generates additional 'acidic' hydrogen ions that may further stabilize the protonated/ionized deoxygenated hemoglobin. Upon return of venous blood into the lung and subsequent exhalation of carbon dioxide, the blood is "de-acidified" (see also: hyperventilation) allowing for the deprotonation/unionization of hemoglobin to then re-enable oxygen-binding as part of the transition to arterial blood (note this process is complex due to involvement of chemoreceptors and other physiological functionalities). Carbon monoxide is not 'ejected' due to acid, therefore carbon monoxide poisoning disturbs this physiological process hence the venous blood of poisoning patients is bright red akin to arterial blood since the carbonyl/carbon monoxide is retained. Hemoglobin is dark in deoxygenated venous blood, but it has a bright red color when carrying blood in oxygenated arterial blood and when converted into carboxyhemoglobin in both arterial and venous blood, so poisoned cadavers and even commercial meats treated with carbon monoxide acquire an unnatural lively reddish hue.

At toxic concentrations, carbon monoxide as carboxyhemoglobin significantly interferes with respiration and gas exchange by simultaneously inhibiting acquisition and delivery of oxygen to cells and preventing formation of carbaminohemoglobin which accounts for approximately 30% of carbon dioxide exportation. Therefore, a patient with carbon monoxide poisoning may experience severe hypoxia and acidosis (potentially both respiratory acidosis and metabolic acidosis) in addition to the toxicities of excess carbon monoxide inhibiting numerous hemoproteins, metallic and non-metallic targets which affect cellular machinery.

=== Myoglobin ===
Carbon monoxide also binds to the hemeprotein myoglobin. It has a high affinity for myoglobin, about 60 times greater than that of oxygen. Carbon monoxide bound to myoglobin may impair its ability to utilize oxygen. This causes reduced cardiac output and hypotension, which may result in brain ischemia. A delayed return of symptoms have been reported. This results following a recurrence of increased carboxyhemoglobin levels; this effect may be due to a late release of carbon monoxide from myoglobin, which subsequently binds to hemoglobin.

=== Cytochrome oxidase ===
Another mechanism involves effects on the mitochondrial respiratory enzyme chain that is responsible for effective tissue utilization of oxygen. Carbon monoxide binds to cytochrome oxidase with less affinity than oxygen, so it is possible that it requires significant intracellular hypoxia before binding. This binding interferes with aerobic metabolism and efficient adenosine triphosphate synthesis. Cells respond by switching to anaerobic metabolism, causing anoxia, lactic acidosis, and eventual cell death. The rate of dissociation between carbon monoxide and cytochrome oxidase is slow, causing a relatively prolonged impairment of oxidative metabolism.

=== Central nervous system effects ===
The mechanism that is thought to have a significant influence on delayed effects involves formed blood cells and chemical mediators, which cause brain lipid peroxidation (degradation of unsaturated fatty acids). Carbon monoxide causes endothelial cell and platelet release of nitric oxide, and the formation of oxygen free radicals including peroxynitrite. In the brain this causes further mitochondrial dysfunction, capillary leakage, leukocyte sequestration, and apoptosis. The result of these effects is lipid peroxidation, which causes delayed reversible demyelination of white matter in the central nervous system known as Grinker myelinopathy, which can lead to edema and necrosis within the brain. This brain damage occurs mainly during the recovery period. This may result in cognitive defects, especially affecting memory and learning, and movement disorders. These disorders are typically related to damage to the cerebral white matter and basal ganglia. Hallmark pathological changes following poisoning are bilateral necrosis of the white matter, globus pallidus, cerebellum, hippocampus and the cerebral cortex.

=== Pregnancy ===
Carbon monoxide poisoning in pregnant women may cause severe adverse fetal effects. Poisoning causes fetal tissue hypoxia by decreasing the release of maternal oxygen to the fetus. Carbon monoxide also crosses the placenta and combines with fetal hemoglobin, causing more direct fetal tissue hypoxia. Additionally, fetal hemoglobin has a 10 to 15% higher affinity for carbon monoxide than adult hemoglobin, causing more severe poisoning in the fetus than in the adult. Elimination of carbon monoxide is slower in the fetus, leading to an accumulation of the toxic chemical. The level of fetal morbidity and mortality in acute carbon monoxide poisoning is significant, so despite mild maternal poisoning or following maternal recovery, severe fetal poisoning or death may still occur.

== History ==
Humans have maintained a complex relationship with carbon monoxide since first learning to control fire circa 800,000 BC. Primitive cavemen probably discovered the toxicity of carbon monoxide upon introducing fire into their dwellings. The early development of metallurgy and smelting technologies emerging circa 6,000 BC through the Bronze Age likewise plagued humankind with carbon monoxide exposure. Apart from the toxicity of carbon monoxide, indigenous Native Americans may have experienced the neuroactive properties of carbon monoxide through shamanistic fireside rituals.

Early civilizations developed mythological tales to explain the origin of fire, such as Vulcan, Pkharmat, and Prometheus from Greek mythology who shared fire with humans. Aristotle (384–322 BC) first recorded that burning coals produced toxic fumes. Greek physician Galen (129–199 AD) speculated that there was a change in the composition of the air that caused harm when inhaled, and symptoms of CO poisoning appeared in Cassius Iatrosophista's Quaestiones Medicae et Problemata Naturalia circa 130 AD. Julian the Apostate, Caelius Aurelianus, and several others similarly documented early knowledge of the toxicity symptoms of carbon monoxide poisoning as caused by coal fumes in the ancient era.

Documented cases by Livy and Cicero allude to carbon monoxide being used as a method of suicide in ancient Rome. Emperor Lucius Verus used smoke to execute prisoners. Many deaths have been linked to carbon monoxide poisoning including Emperor Jovian, Empress Fausta, and Seneca. The most high-profile death by carbon monoxide poisoning may possibly have been Cleopatra or Edgar Allan Poe.

In the fifteenth century, coal miners believed sudden death was caused by evil spirits; carbon monoxide poisoning has been linked to supernatural and paranormal experiences, witchcraft, etc. throughout the following centuries including in the modern present day exemplified by Carrie Poppy's investigations.

Georg Ernst Stahl mentioned carbonarii halitus in 1697 in reference to toxic vapors thought to be carbon monoxide. Friedrich Hoffmann conducted the first modern scientific investigation into carbon monoxide poisoning from coal in 1716, notably rejecting villagers attributing death to demonic superstition. Herman Boerhaave conducted the first scientific experiments on the effect of carbon monoxide (coal fumes) on animals in the 1730s. Joseph Priestley is credited with first synthesizing carbon monoxide in 1772 which he had called heavy inflammable air, and Carl Wilhelm Scheele isolated carbon monoxide from coal in 1773 suggesting it to be the toxic entity.

The dose-dependent risk of carbon monoxide poisoning as hydrocarbonate was investigated in the late 1790s by Thomas Beddoes, James Watt, Tiberius Cavallo, James Lind, Humphry Davy, and many others in the context of inhalation of factitious airs, much of which occurred at the Pneumatic Institution.

William Cruickshank discovered carbon monoxide as a molecule containing one carbon and one oxygen atom in 1800, thereby initiating the modern era of research exclusively focused on carbon monoxide. The mechanism for toxicity was first suggested by James Watt in 1793, followed by Adrien Chenot in 1854 and finally demonstrated by Claude Bernard after 1846 as published in 1857 and also independently published by Felix Hoppe-Seyler in the same year.

The first controlled clinical trial studying the toxicity of carbon monoxide occurred in 1973.

=== Historical detection ===
Carbon monoxide poisoning has plagued coal miners for many centuries. In the context of mining, carbon monoxide is widely known as whitedamp. John Scott Haldane identified carbon monoxide as the lethal constituent of afterdamp, the gas created by combustion, after examining many bodies of miners killed in pit explosions. By 1911, Haldane introduced the use of small animals for miners to detect dangerous levels of carbon monoxide underground, either white mice or canaries which have little tolerance for carbon monoxide thereby offering an early warning, i.e. canary in a coal mine. The canary in British pits was replaced in 1986 by the electronic gas detector.

The first qualitative analytical method to detect carboxyhemoglobin emerged in 1858 with a colorimetric method developed by Felix Hoppe-Seyler, and the first quantitative analysis method emerged in 1880 with Josef von Fodor.

=== Historical treatment ===
The use of oxygen emerged with anecdotal reports such as Humphry Davy having been treated with oxygen in 1799 upon inhaling three quarts of hydrocarbonate (water gas). Samuel Witter developed an oxygen inhalation protocol in response to carbon monoxide poisoning in 1814. Similarly, an oxygen inhalation protocol was recommend for malaria (literally translated to "bad air") in 1830 based on malaria symptoms aligning with carbon monoxide poisoning. Other oxygen protocols emerged in the late 1800s. The use of hyperbaric oxygen in rats following poisoning was studied by Haldane in 1895 while its use in humans began in the 1960s.

=== Incidents ===
The worst accidental mass poisoning from carbon monoxide was the Balvano train disaster which occurred on 3 March 1944 in Italy, when a freight train with many illegal passengers stalled in a tunnel, leading to the death of over 500 people.

Over 50 people are suspected to have died from smoke inhalation as a result of the Branch Davidian Massacre during the Waco siege in 1993.

On 14 December 2024 12 individuals died by carbon monoxide poisoning in Gudauri (Georgia) as electric generators using fuel oil were placed in a closed area near their rooms.

=== Weaponization ===
In ancient history, Hannibal executed Roman prisoners with coal fumes during the Second Punic War.

The extermination of stray dogs by a carbon monoxide gas chamber was described in 1874. In 1884, an article appeared in Scientific American describing the use of a carbon monoxide gas chamber for slaughterhouse operations as well as euthanizing a variety of animals.

As part of the Holocaust during World War II, the Nazis used gas vans at Chelmno extermination camp and elsewhere to murder an estimated 700,000 or more people by carbon monoxide poisoning. This method was also used in the gas chambers of several death camps such as Treblinka, Sobibor, and Belzec. Gassing with carbon monoxide started in Action T4. The gas was supplied by IG Farben in pressurized cylinders and fed by tubes into the gas chambers built at various mental hospitals, such as Hartheim Euthanasia Centre. Exhaust fumes from tank engines, for example, were used to supply the gas to the chambers.
