= Robert John Thornton =

British botanist and author (1768–1837)

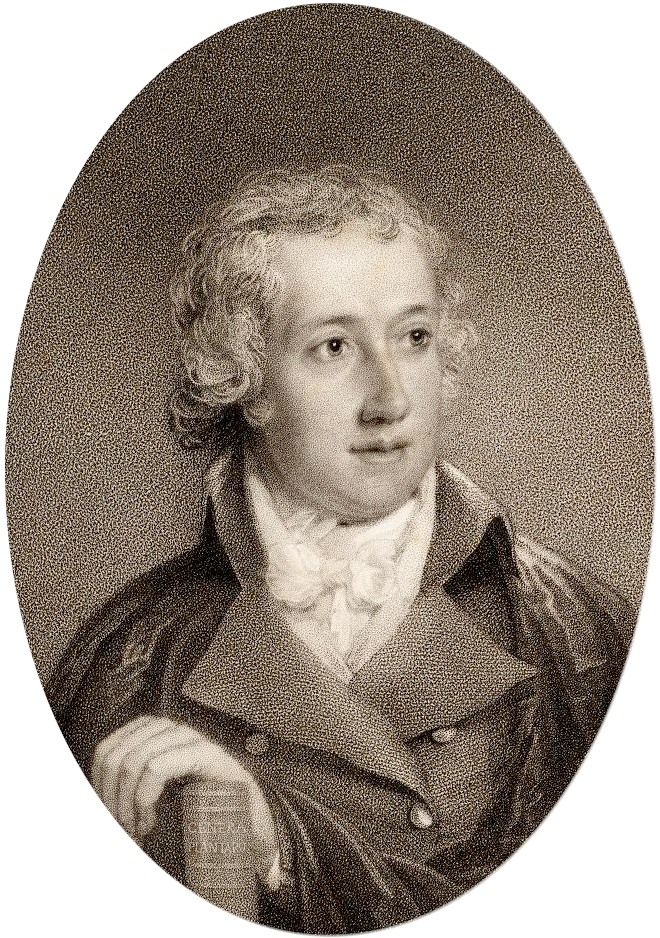
Robert John Thornton (1799)

Robert John Thornton (1768–1837) was an English physician and botanical writer, noted for A New Illustration of the Sexual System of Carolus Von Linnæus (1797–1807) and "The British Flora" of 1812.

== Life ==
He was the son of Bonnell Thornton, born in the year his father died. and studied at Trinity College, Cambridge. Inspired by John Martyn's lectures on botany and the work of Linnaeus, he switched from the Church to medicine. Thornton was interested in the therapeutic potential of factitious airs, inspired by the work of Thomas Beddoes at the Pneumatic Institution. He worked at Guy's Hospital in London, where he later lectured in medical botany. After spending some time abroad, he settled and practised in London. Robert inherited the family fortune after the death of both his brother and mother.

Thornton died in destitution.

== Works ==
In 1799 Thornton commenced his work on the New Illustration of the Sexual System of Carolus von Linnaeus, a work of botanical science to be published in three parts. The first was a dissertation on the sex of plants according to the Swedish scientist Carolus von Linnaeus, and the second an exposition of the sexual system. The most ambitious part of the New Illustration of the Sexual System of Carolus Linnæus was Part III, the Temple of Flora (1799–1807). The first plates were engraved by Thomas Medland in May 1798, from paintings by Philip Reinagle. Between 1798 and 1807, they produced a total of thirty-three coloured plates, engraved in aquatint, stipple and line engraving. When he planned the project, Thornton had decided to publish seventy folio-size plates. Lack of interest from the general public spelled disaster for the scheme, and the holding of a lottery authorised by the Thornton's Paintings, Drawings, Engravings and Books Act 1811 (51 Geo. 3. c. ciii) could not save it from financial ruin, neither did a page in the work dedicated to the spouse of George III, Queen Charlotte, patroness of botany and the fine arts. It is estimated that around 800 copies were produced, each containing 31 plates accompanied by inspirational poetry and explanatory notes covering flower lore and legend.

Published:- Thornton, R.J. 1812. Elements of Botany Part 1. Classification. London. Dedicated to Rev. Thomas Martyn, M.A.F.R.S.

== Gallery ==
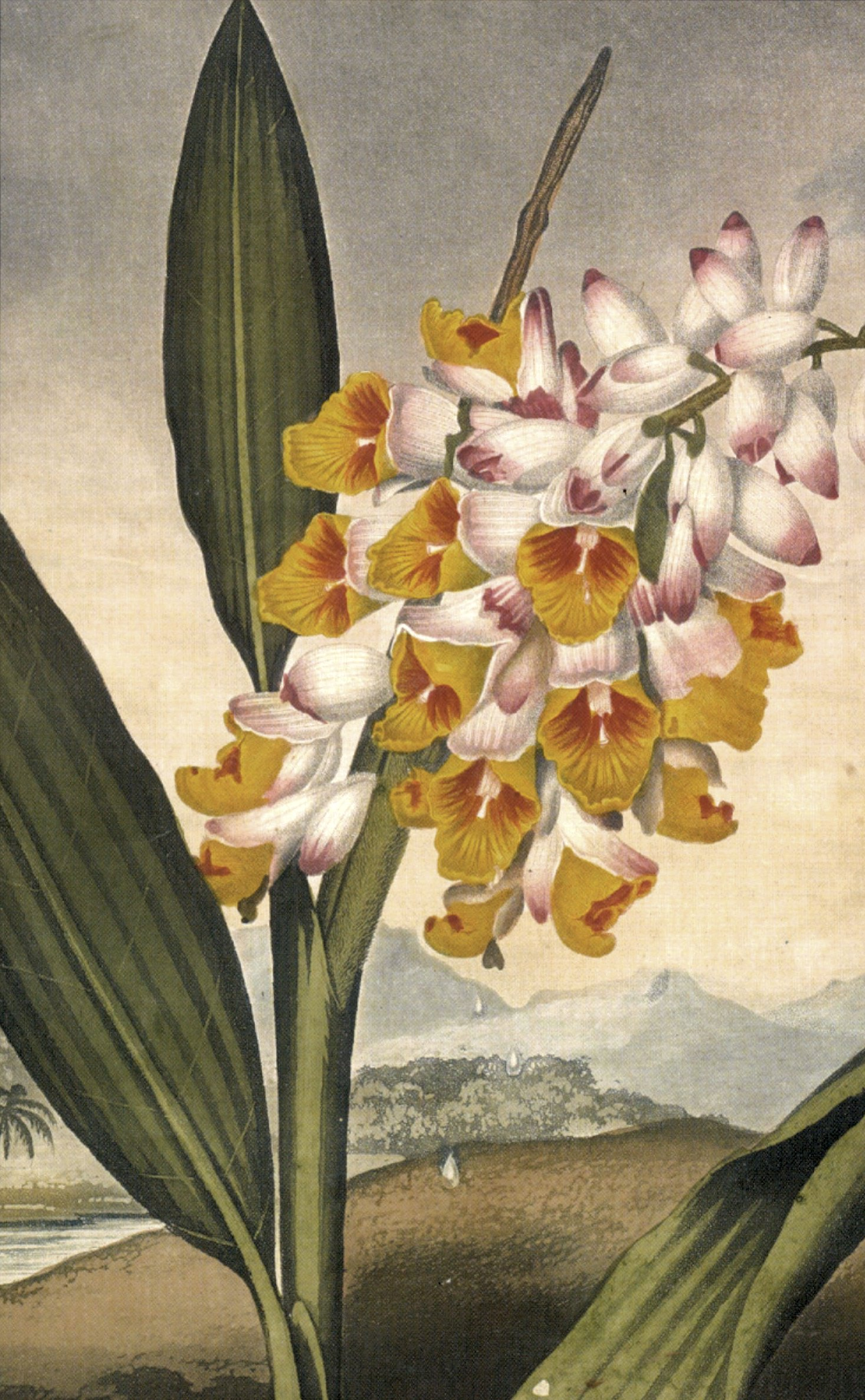
Alpinia zerumbet as syn. Renealmia nutans in Temple of Flora by Robert John Thornton, 1812

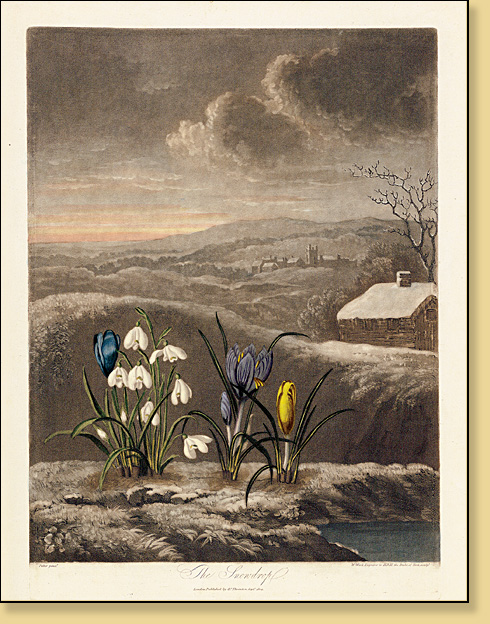
Snowdrop, The Temple of Flora (1797-1810)
