= Roy Grinker =

Roy Grinker may refer to:

- Roy R. Grinker Sr. (1900–1990), American neurologist and psychiatrist
- Roy Richard Grinker (born 1961, American author and professor of anthropology
