= Robert Harrington (writer) =

English writer and physician

- Born: 1751
- Died: 1837 (aged 85–86)
- Occupations: Writer and physician
- Spouse: Margaret Benson
- Children: Henry Harrington
- Parents: Robert Harrington (father); Jane Hall (mother)

Robert Harrington (1751-1836) (fl. 1780 - 1815) was an English eccentric writer on natural philosophy, and physician.

== Biography ==
Harrington was born in Carlisle. His father was Robert Harrington (d. 1753) and his mother was Jane Hall. He married Margaret Benson and had a son, Henry Harrington, who died in 1816 and was buried at St. Paul's Church in Leeds. He died in 1836 or 1837.

He studied at Edinburgh University under Joseph Black and became a member of the Company of Surgeons of London before 1781. He practised at Carlisle, where in 1810 he resided in Abbey Street (Picture of Carlisle, 1810, p. 131).

Harrington was a believer in Phlogiston, and attempted to discredit Antoine Lavoisier's theory of combustion and other discoveries, often publishing on topics relating to factitious airs. He also criticized Thomas Beddoes and Humphry Davy as "aerial flying chemists" with their "ecstatic, lunatic, and Laputatic sensations" regarding nitrous oxide experiments conducted at the Pneumatic Institution in Bristol.

== Works ==
- 'Philosophical and Experimental Inquiry into the First and General Principles of Life,' London, 1781 (Monthly Review, lxvi. 98).
- 'Thoughts on the Properties and Formations of different kinds of Air,' London, 1785 (ib. lxxiv. 449).
- 'Letter ... to Dr. Priestley, Messrs.
- Cavendish, Lavoisier, and Kerwan ... to prove that their ... opinions of Inflammable and Dephlogisticated Airs forming Water, and the Acids being compounded of different Airs, are fallacious,' London, 1786.
- 'A Treatise on Air: containing New Experiments and Thoughts on Combustion; a full investigation of M. Lavoisier's System ... proving ... its erroneous principles,' London; 1791 . This work was published under the pseudonym of 'Richard Bewley, M.D.' (ib. 2nd ser. vi. 435, xiv. 462).
- 'Chemical Essays ... with Observations and Strictures on Dr. Priestley,' &c., London, 1794 (ib. vi. 435).
- 'A New System on Fire and Planetary Life, showing that the Sun and Planets are inhabited, and that they enjoy the same Temperament as our Earth : also an Elucidation of the Phenomena of Electricity and Magnetism,' 1796, 8vo (ib. xxii. 107).
- 'Some New Experiments, with Observations upon Heat ... also Letter to Henry Cavendish, esq.,' London, 1798.
- 'Experiments and Observations onVolta's Electric Pile. ... Also Observations on Dr. Herschell's Papers on Light and Heat,' Carlisle, 1801.
- 'The Death-warrant of the French Theory of Chemistry With a Theory fully ... accounting for all the Phenomena. Also a full ... Investigation of ... Galvanism, and Strictures upon the Chemical Opinions of Messrs. Weiglet, Cruickshanks, Davy, Leslie, Count Rumford, and Dr. Thompson; likewise Remarks upon Mr. Dalton's late Theory and other Observations,' 1804, 8vo.
- An Elucidation and Extension of the Harringtonian System of Chemistry, explaining all the Phenomena without one single Anomaly,' London, 1819. The Harringtonian system of the atmosphere was defended and developed in the *'Medical Spectator,' 1794, attributed to Dr. John Sherwin (Nichols, Lit. Anecd. ix. 150). Harrington's critics speak of his uncouth style and desultory reasoning.
