= Unstrange Minds =

Book by Roy Richard Grinker

- Author: Roy Richard Grinker
- Language: English
- Subject: Autism
- Genre: Non-fiction
- Publisher: Basic Books
- Publication date: 2007
- Media type: Paperback
- Pages: 352
- ISBN: 0-465-02764-4

Unstrange Minds is a nonfiction book by anthropologist Roy Richard Grinker about the rise in autism diagnoses throughout the world over the last twenty years.

It provides a cultural history of autism and describes the experiences of parents of children with autism in the United States, South Korea, India, and South Africa. Along with this, Grinker includes his own personal experiences with his autistic daughter, Isabel. Grinker argues that there is no autism epidemic, but that the higher prevalence rates are a sign of progress in treating and educating children with developmental disorders and disabilities. He also provides information on the medical anthropology of the disorder itself and the reliability and validity of the psychological construction that is autism.

The newer, higher, more accurate statistics on autism are a sign that we are finally seeing and appreciating a kind of human difference that we once turned away from and that many other cultures still hide away in homes or institutions or denigrate as bizarre.

The title comes from an untitled poem by E.E. Cummings in which he criticized his society's need for conformity.
