= Anthropological Quarterly =

- Discipline: Anthropology
- Language: English
- Edited by: Roy Richard Grinker

Publication details
- Former name(s): Primitive Man
- History: 1921–present
- Publisher: George Washington University Institute for Ethnographic Research
- Frequency: Quarterly

Standard abbreviations
- ISO 4: Anthropol. Q.

Indexing
- ISSN: 0003-5491 (print); 1534-1518 (web)
- JSTOR: anthquar

Links
- Journal homepage

Anthropological Quarterly is a widely read peer-reviewed journal covering topics in social and cultural anthropology. It is housed at the George Washington University Institute for Ethnographic Research.

Anthropological Quarterly was founded in 1921 by John Montgomery Cooper of The Catholic University of America and was published by The Catholic University of America Press from 1921 to 1953 under the name Primitive Man. Since 2001, the journal has been published by the George Washington University Institute for Ethnographic Research.

The journal publishes articles, social thought and commentary essays on timely political and social issues, book reviews, and book review essays.

As of 2022 the journal is edited by Roy Richard Grinker.
