= Pneumatic Institution =

Medical research facility in Bristol, England

Coordinates: 51°27′5″N 2°37′13″W

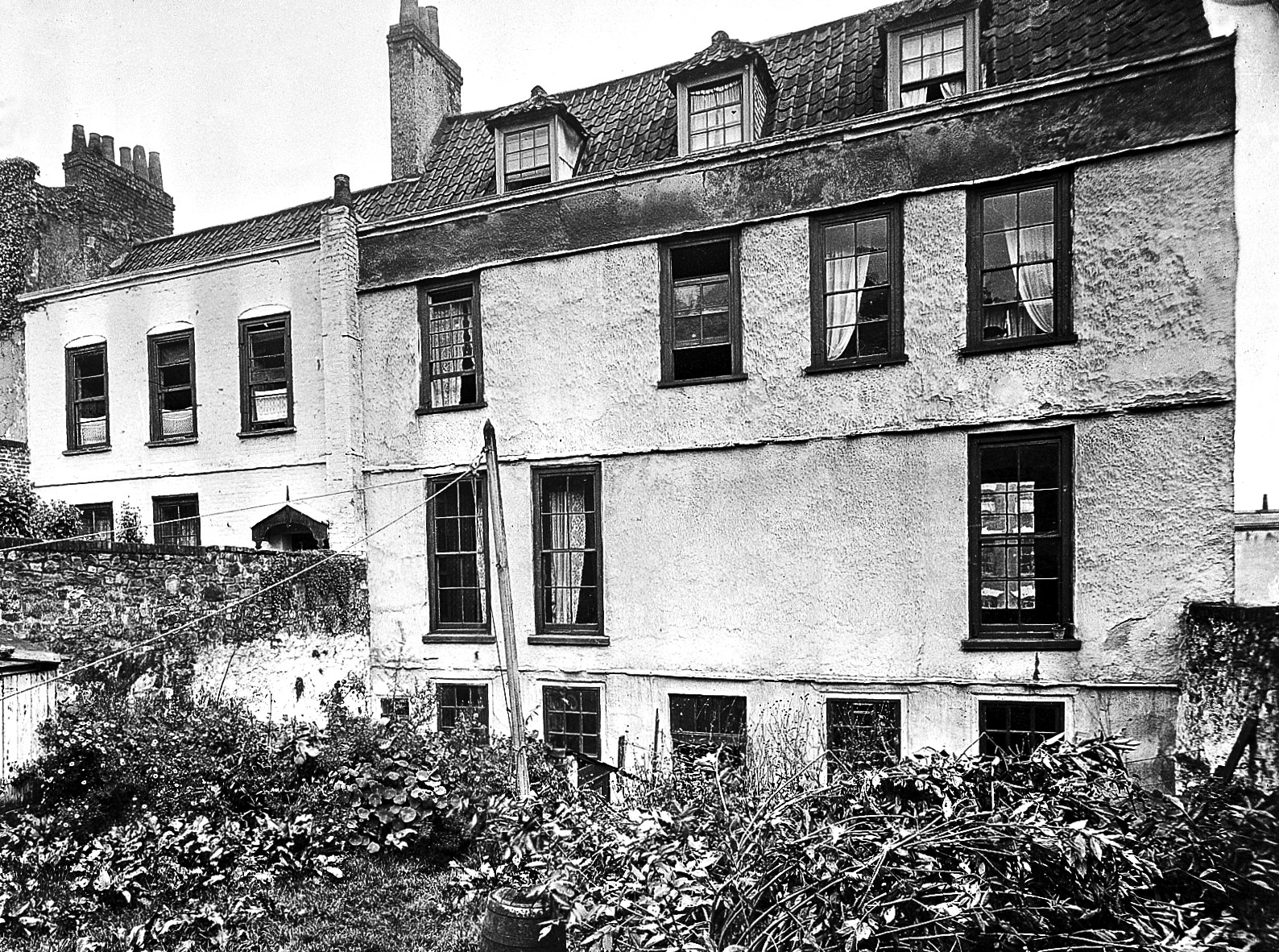
- Bristol Pneumatic Institute
- Successor: Preventive Medical Institution
- Formation: 1799
- Founder: Thomas Beddoes
- Dissolved: 1802
- Location: Bristol
- Website: davyshouse.co.uk

The Pneumatic Medical Institution of Bristol (also referred to as the Medical Pneumatic Institute, Pneumatic Institute and Pneumatic Establishment) was a medical research facility in Bristol, England, in 1799–1802. It was established by Thomas Beddoes to study the medical effects of newly discovered gases known as factitious airs. Humphry Davy headed the Institution's laboratory for a period of time, examining the effects of laughing gas on himself and others, and James Watt designed much of the lab's equipment. The institute is often regarded as one of the world's first medical research institutions.

== History ==
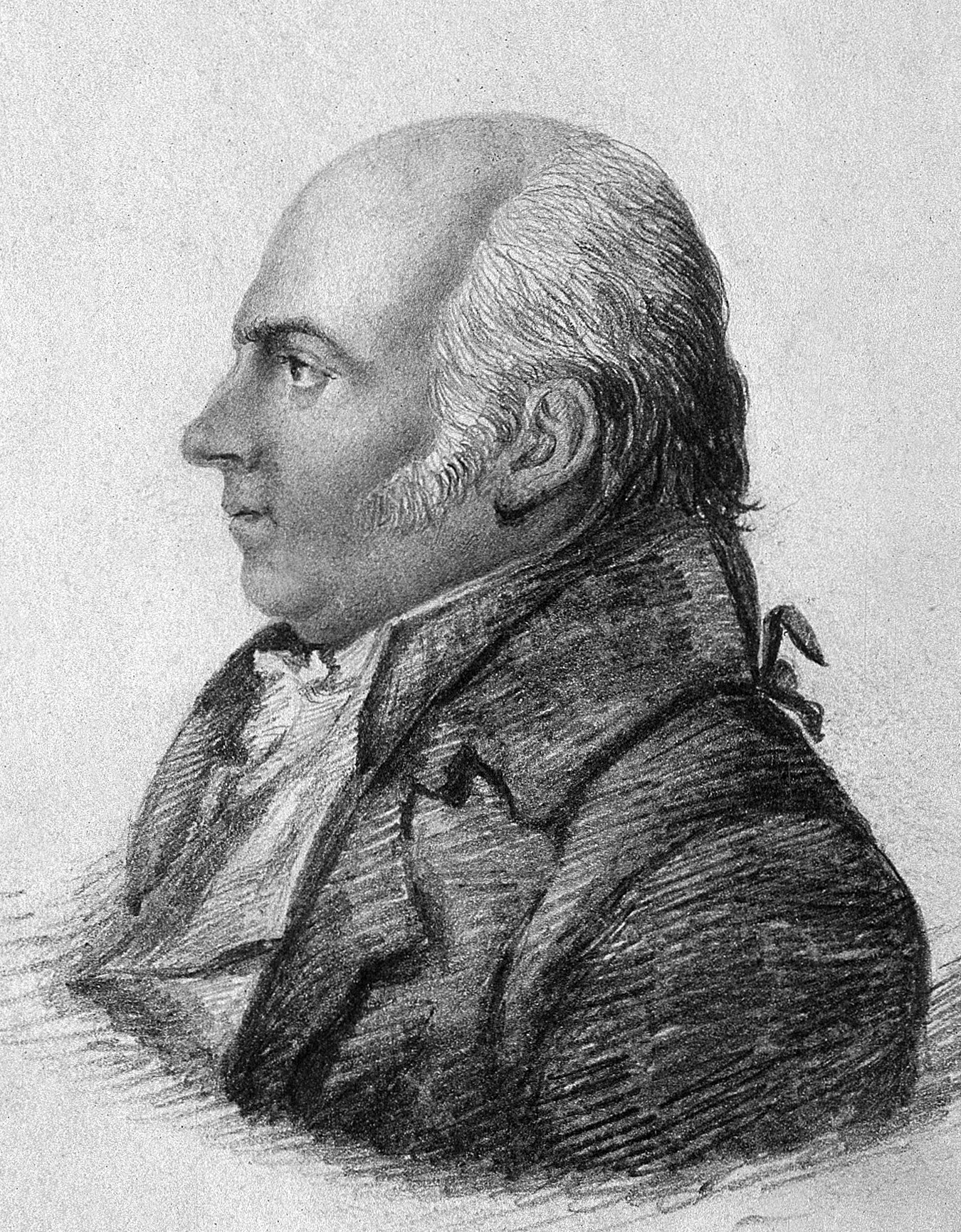
Thomas Beddoes, founder of the Pneumatic Institution, Bristol, by Edward Bird

=== Preliminaries ===
After Lavoisier had established the role of oxygen in animal respiration during the chemical revolution, members of the Lunar Society who studied factitious airs, such as Joseph Priestley who had co-discovered oxygen, originated the fields of pneumatic chemistry and pneumatic medicine which eventually led to the establishment of the Pneumatic Institution.

Georgiana, Duchess of Devonshire, who was unusually educated about Chemistry through her relation to Henry Cavendish, visited Thomas Beddoes in his laboratory in Hope Square, Bristol, in December 1793. He had set it up earlier that year to study possible medical uses of the recently discovered gases. During her second, extended, visit, "the idea of replacing the existing outpatient facility with a hospital—a Medical Pneumatic Institution—was first formulated." In 1794, she tried to persuade Sir Joseph Banks, who was President of the Royal Society of London at the time, to lend support to Beddoes' efforts. Banks refused, citing scientific objections in addition to his political concerns about Beddoes' sympathising with the French Revolution. Even a supporting request from Watt did not change Banks' mind.

=== Establishment ===
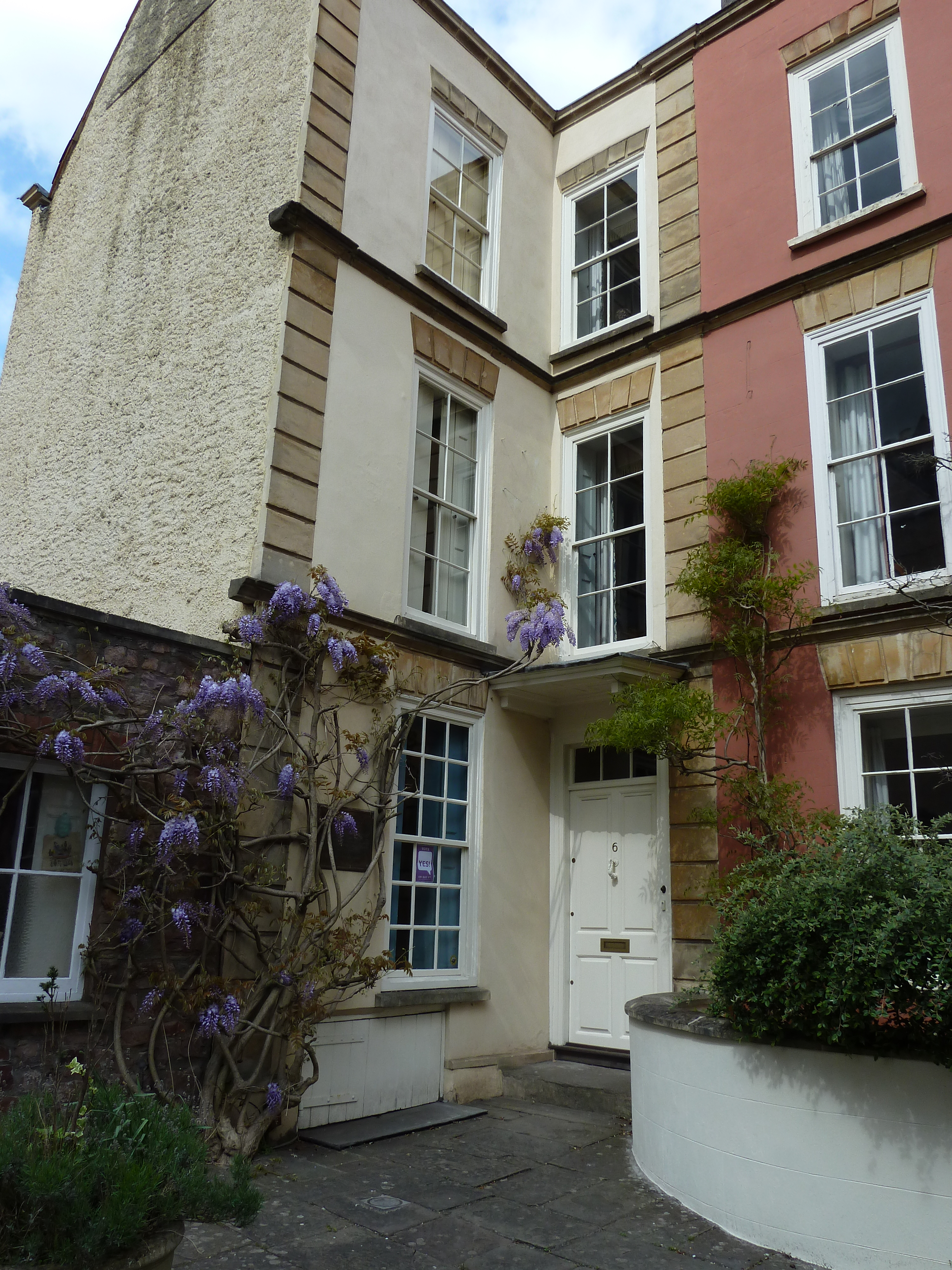
6 Dowry Square, Bristol, site of the Pneumatic Institution

Beddoes had moved from Oxford in 1793 and established himself as a physician. He moved to the Hotwells area of Bristol, where the geothermal springs had been credited with healing properties since the 15th century, and which had become a locus for tuberculosis sufferers seeking a cure. By 1794 Beddoes had arranged for the manufacture of suitable apparatus by the firm of Boulton and Watt and the first of the "pneumatic patients" was a Mr Knight of Painswick, whom Beddoes treated with "unrespirable airs" for a pelvic ulcer. By 5 March 1795 Beddoes was reporting successful treatment of paralytic patients and ordering an apparatus and oxygen for a Mr Gladwell in Clifton.

Between 1792 and 1798, Beddoes had collected and published many "case histories" sent to him by other sympathetic physicians, from many parts of the country, and principally concerning the inhalation of oxygen and hydrogen.

In November 1798, Beddoes rented two buildings at 6 and 7 Dowry Square, in Hotwells, and in March 1799 the laboratory was moved into the smaller one and the Institution was publicly announced. Beddoes anticipated that scientific investigations and medical treatment would be carried out side by side.

=== Humphry Davy's experiments ===
In March 1798 Humphry Davy had become interested in the issue after reading Samuel Latham Mitchell's Remarks on the gaseous oxyd of nitrogen and its effects (1795) which claimed that nitrous oxide would have a catastrophic impact if inhaled or placed in contact with a patient's skin, going as far as to suggest that it was the very "principle of contagion".

Davy joined the Pneumatic Institution in 1798 as the superintendent, largely through the recommendation of Davies Giddy, and it was here that he undertook experiments that included himself inhaling nitrous oxide, which he called laughing gas for its effects. Davy wrote up an account of his investigations at the Institution which was published by John Murray in 1800 as, Researches, chemical and philosophical, chiefly concerning nitrous oxide, or dephlogisticated nitrous air, and its respiration. The extensive list of patients volunteering to inhale nitrous oxide has contributed to the institutes reputation as one of the first psychedelic communes.

This and other gases were administered, without charge, to willing subjects, particularly those with diseases considered to be incurable at the time. Although the initial aim had been to treat patients with tuberculosis, most of the patients treated suffered from some form of paralysis.

James Woodhouse traveled to London in 1802 to visit Davy and later returned to America attempting to replicate experiments with nitrous oxide in his chemistry classes at the University of Pennsylvania School of Medicine. One of his students, William P. C. Barton, wrote his dissertation in defense of the nitrous oxide research at the Pneumatic Institute.

=== James Watt's involvement ===
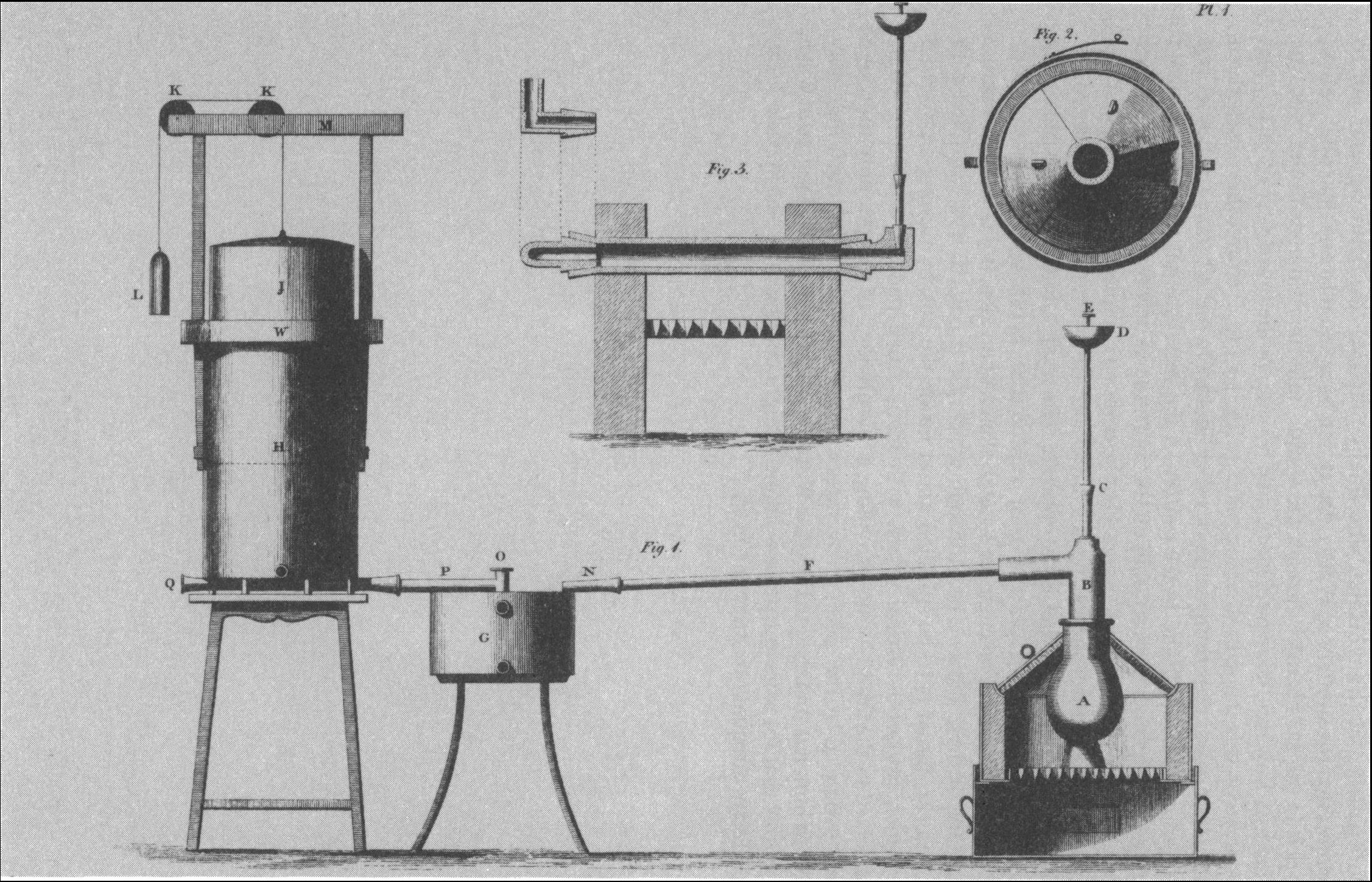
Apparatus designed by James Watt in preparation of the Pneumatic Institution

James Watt supported the Institution because conventional methods had failed to help against his son's pulmonary tuberculosis (known as consumption at the time), which had previously claimed his daughter Jessie. The suggestion of engaging Beddoes to treat Jessie had been made by Erasmus Darwin, and Beddoes undertook to administer "fixt air" (carbon dioxide), despite the absence of suitable equipment. The treatment had no beneficial effect and Watt's daughter died.

Watt designed many of the apparatuses and techniques necessary to produce and administer various gases.

=== Controversy ===
Beddoes was widely regarded as a political radical for his progressive views in support of the French Revolution.

In Tiberius Cavallo's An Essay On The Medical Properties of Factitious Airs, an excerpt from Beddoes was published without his name with the authorship attributed to "Communicated by an Intelligent Gentleman in the West of this Island".

Robert Harrington was a critic of Davy and Beddoes referring to them as "aerial flying chemists" with their "elastic, lunatic, and Laputatic sensations".

=== Disestablishment and legacy ===
The Pneumatic Institution was converted into a normal hospital when typhus broke out in Bristol in 1800. Davy left in 1801 to join Sir Joseph at the Royal Institution.

The Bristol Pneumatic Institution closed down in 1802 and transitioned to become the Preventive Medical Institute between 1802-1807, informally referred to as the Medical Institution for the Benefit of the Sick and Drooping Poor, Medical Institution for the Poor, or the Hotwells Institution. A second location for the Preventive Medical Institute opened in 1803 at Lower Tower Court, Broad Quay, which was a historical area that no longer exists due to redevelopments in the docks area. Beddoes devoted himself to teaching preventative medicine at this site. The Broad Quay location may have been the main site of the Preventive Medical Institute by 1809 and remained active until at least 1817. Johann Peter Frank, who was best known for his work in hygiene and contributions towards the prehistory of public health, visited Beddoes and extensively studied his work at The Preventive Medical Institute.

In 1812 Thomas Whippie founded the Clifton Dispensary. Some scholars have speculated the Dispensary may have temporarily operated at the site of the Pneumatic Institute / Preventative Medical Institute in Dowry Square units No. 6-7 after the Institute moved to Broad Quay. From 1823 onward the Clifton Dispensary operated from No. 13 Dowry Square and remained affiliated with the Bristol Medical School until 1948 or 1952. Although the Clifton Dispensary was not in the direct lineage of the Preventive Medical Institute, it is regarded as the spiritual successor that carried on the ideas and principles of preventive care, education, and public health that Beddoes had advocated for and practiced.

Many of the techniques and tools developed by Watt for the Pneumatic Institution are still used in modern medicine.

== Notable affiliates ==
=== Pneumatic Institute Staff ===
- Thomas Beddoes (1760-1808), physician, founder and director. Planned to open the Bristol Philosophical School.
- Humphry Davy (1778-1829), chemist and medical superintendent. Important discoveries in chemistry and electricity, invented miners safety hat. President of the Royal Society and Knight Bachelor.
- John King (1766-1846), surgeon and physiological superintendent. Helped establish the Bristol School of Artists. A portrait of King by Washington Allston is on display at the De Young Museum as part of the Rockefeller Collection.
- John Sadler (1779-1838), chemist and metallurgist, son of James Sadler. Taught chemistry at the institution, built laboratory instruments. Best known for publishing An Explanation of Terms Used in Chemistry (1804).
- Peter Mark Roget (1779-1869) physician and laboratory assistant to Davy for experiments with nitrous oxide. Contributed to Beddoes's observations on tuberculosis. Best known for Roget's Thesaurus.
- William Clayfield (1772-1837), Bristol wine merchant, amateur botanist and geologist, founding member of the institution. Designed lab equipment including a mercurial-air holder (adopted from Watt's previous designs) enabling precise measurements in Davy's nitrous oxide experiments. Published article on strontites discovered around Bristol.
- John Edmonds Stock (1774-1835) physician, joined Beddoes as a staff physician around 1804 when the institute became known as the Hotwells Institution. Best known for authoring Beddoes's biography, Memoirs of the Life of Thomas Beddoes, M.D. (1811).
- Robert Kinglake (1765-1842) part-time physician
- Patrick Dwyer, attendant
- James Tobin, attendant / observer

=== Corresponding Affiliates ===
- James Watt, Erasmus Darwin, James Lind, Davies Giddy, Joseph Priestley, Richard Kirwan, John Carmichael, Robert John Thornton

=== Patrons ===
- Georgiana Cavendish, Duchess of Devonshire
- William Cavendish, 5th Duke of Devonshire
- William Legge, 2nd Earl of Dartmouth, William Fitzwilliam, 4th Earl Fitzwilliam, George Wyndham, 3rd Earl of Egremont, Samuel Whitbread, George Spencer, 4th Duke of Marlborough, Francis Ingram-Seymour-Conway, 2nd Marquess of Hertford, Godfrey Webster, 4th Baronet, Marquess of Lansdowne
- Josiah Wedgwood, Thomas Wedgwood, Jan Ingen-Housz, Joseph Black, Matthew Boulton, William Reynolds, Alexander Monro III, John Ewart, Samuel More, James Currie, Thomas Percival, David Dundas, Walter Farquhar, Francis Galton, Edward Johnstone, Samuel Parr, Astley Cooper,

==== Trustees ====
- Benjamin Hammet, John Grant, Alexander Anderson

=== Notable Patients ===
- Robert Southey (1774-1843) volunteer test subject for the effects of nitrous oxide. Close friend of Davy and Beddoes, central figure in bridging the institution to the romantic literary circle in Bristol.
- Samuel Taylor Coleridge (1772-1834) participated in Davy's nitrous oxide experiments and bridged pneumatic chemistry with ideas about mind, perception and creativity. Friend and close associate of Beddoes who played a central role in making the institute an intellectual hub for poets, scientists and reformers.
- Anna Laetitia Barbauld (1743-1825) volunteer test subject for the effects of nitrous oxide.
- John Rickman (1771-1840) volunteer test subject for the effects of nitrous oxide.
- Grosvenor Charles Bedford (1773-1839) volunteer test subject for the effects of nitrous oxide.
- Maria Edgeworth (1768-1849) volunteer test subject for the effects of nitrous oxide.
- Joseph Cottle (1770-1853) volunteer test subject for the effects of nitrous oxide.

== Sources ==
- Bergman, Norman A. (1998). "Georgiana, Duchess of Devonshire, and Princess Diana: a parallel". J R Soc Med. 91 (4): 217–219. doi:10.1177/014107689809100414. PMC 1296647. PMID 9659313.
- Cartwright, F. F. (1950). "Humphry Davy's Contribution to Anæsthesia". Proceedings of the Royal Society of Medicine. 43 (7): 571–578. doi:10.1177/003591575004300721. PMC 2081366. PMID 15440782.
- Duncum, Barbara M. (1946). "Ether Anaesthesia 1842–1900". Postgrad Med J. 22 (252): 280–281. doi:10.1136/pgmj.22.252.280. PMC 2478430. PMID 20276652.
- Grainge, C. (2004). "Breath of life: the evolution of oxygen therapy". J R Soc Med. 97 (10): 489–93. doi:10.1177/0141076809701011. PMC 1079621. PMID 15459264.
- Martin, Lawrence (2011). "Oxygen Therapy: The First 150 Years".
- Pearce, David (2008). "Utopian Surgery. Early arguments against anaesthesia in surgery, dentistry and childbirth".
- Stansfield, Dorothy A., Stansfield, Ronald G. (1986). "Dr. Thomas Beddoes and James Watt: Preparatory Work 1794–96 for the Bristol Pneumatic Institute". Medical History. 30 (3): 276–302. doi:10.1017/s0025727300045713. PMC 1139651. PMID 3523076.
