= Grinker myelinopathy =

- Other names: Delayed post-hypoxic Encephalopathy, Delayed post-hypoxic Leukoencephalopathy (DPHL), Delayed post-anoxic leukoencephalopathy, Delayed post-anoxic encephalopathy, Delayed post-hypoxic encephalopathy, Delayed neurologic sequelae
- Specialty: Neurology

Grinker's myelinopathy, also known as anoxic leukoencephalopathy, is a rare disease of the central nervous system. The disease is characterized by a delayed leukoencephalopathy after a hypoxic episode. It is typically, though not necessarily, related to carbon monoxide poisoning or heroin overdose. It occurs in roughly 2.8% of those who experience an acute hypoxic/anoxic episode. Because of the wide range of symptoms and the delay in onset, it is often misdiagnosed as other neuropathologies. Grinker's myelinopathy was originally characterized by Roy R. Grinker in 1925 or 1926, depending on the source.

== Categorization ==
Following an apparent rehabilitation from a severe episode of prolonged cerebral oxygen deprivation, patients with Grinker's myelinopathy begin to experience massive white matter death that leads to a wide range of neurological dysfunctions ranging from confusion and apathy to Parkinson-like symptoms.

== Symptoms ==
The symptoms have been known to include apathy, dementia, Parkinsonism, agitation, urinary incontinence, and pseudobulbar palsy, among many other neuropsychiatric symptoms. Microscopically, extensive hemispheric demyelination and the degeneration of basal ganglia are observed.

=== Onset ===
The onset of the symptoms usually occurs several weeks after the initial hypoxic episode. The hypoxic episode is necessarily severe, usually with an arterial oxygen partial pressure less than 40mmHg. Following the severe hypoxia, the patient typically falls unconscious or into a coma, with the exception of cases of carbon monoxide poisoning. If the patient recovers from this unconscious state, usually within 24 hours, it is typically followed by a successful recovery over a few days (generally 4 to 5). After the short recovery, a lucid period is observed, lasting anywhere from 1 to 4 weeks, in which the patient exhibits no symptoms related to the anoxic episode. It is after this period that the degenerative symptoms begin to appear and rapidly grow in severity.

== Causes ==
The main cause of the neurological disorders is believed to be demyelination of the cerebral hemispheres, though there is currently no widely accepted consensus on why. The most commonly accepted theories for the cause of demyelination include hypoxia and cerebral edema due to carbon monoxide toxicity, drug overdose, or cerebral blood vessel damage, and a disruption of myelin-producing pathways.

=== Carbon monoxide toxicity ===
Because carbon monoxide binds to hemoglobin more efficiently than oxygen and lower systemic blood pressure brought upon by an acute anoxic episode in conjunction with carbon monoxide poisoning often leads to cerebral ischemia, a condition where the brain does not receive enough oxygen to satisfy its needs. This results in lesions to a great deal of subcortical cerebral white matter but leaves axons, U-fibers, and perivascular myelin mostly untouched. Support against this theory stems from the ability to replicate these lesions by using nitrogen-induced hypoxia and hypotension in cats and the onset of this disease in individuals who experienced acute hypoxia without carbon monoxide poisoning

=== Cerebral edema ===
Cerebral edema, or unusual swelling of the brain, is commonly caused by anoxic episodes. If it is severe enough, it is known to cause preferential damage to cerebral white matter due to excessive swelling of glial cells while leaving many other tissues unharmed.

This theory suggests that hypoxia and carbon monoxide induce a form of edema resulting in white matter necrosis. Evidence for this theory comes from the observation of pathological lesions mimicking those of carbon monoxide poisoning where hypoxia and dehydration along with too-rapid rehydration have taken place without carbon monoxide present.

=== Disruption of myelin-creating pathways ===
The anoxic event is likely to cause damage to cytoplasmic ATP-dependent enzymes in oligodendrocytes. Because many of these enzymes play essential roles in myelin turnover, damage to these enzymes is thought to adversely affect the ability of the body to sustain myelin in white matter, leading to the demyelination of those areas of the brain. The inability to regenerate and remove myelin on certain cells is thought to be responsible for the delay in onset of the disease and for the specificity of the white matter death.

== Diagnosis ==
Grinker's myelinopathy is diagnosed by establishing a clinical history of carbon monoxide poisoning, narcotic overdose, myocardial infarction, or other global cerebral hypoxic events. This diagnosis can then be supported by neuroimaging confirmation of broadcast cerebral hemisphere demyelination sparing cerebellar and brainstem tracts. The neuroimaging evidence can also be used to diagnose Grinker's myelinopathy through an elevation in the concentrations of a myelin basic protein in the cerebrospinal fluid . Because this disease shares many of the symptoms with various forms of dementia or hysteria, these possibilities must be eliminated before a diagnosis for Grinker's myelinopathy can be made.

=== Neuroimaging ===
While there are no standard criteria for the diagnosis of Grinker's myelinopathy, neuroimaging can be an important diagnostic tool in ruling out other diagnoses. Magnetic resonance imaging (MRI) or computed tomography (CT) scans can be used to demonstrate a decrease in white matter density in the patient's cerebral hemispheres, with the typical exception of overlying cortices. Unexplained, uniform demyelination of white matter can indicate acute onset Grinker's myelinopathy.

== Treatment ==
Treatment of Grinker's myelinopathy is still in the experimental stages and is very individualized. Some suggested treatments are early supportive care, rehabilitation therapies, oxygen treatments, and bed rest. Some episodes of Grinker's myelinopathy that progress to comas have no known treatment to reverse the course.

Early supportive care is the anchor of treatment during the first two weeks. Rehabilitation is an important part of the care process and it is important to start the rehabilitation as soon as the patient is able to participate in therapy. Types of therapy include: physical therapy, occupational therapy, speech therapy, and respiratory therapy. These therapies are used to assess the patient's functional status and to develop treatment goals. Each goal is individualized to target the specific neurological impairments to improve the patient's functional abilities.

One way to prevent the likelihood of Grinker's myelinopathy occurring is standard or hyperbaric oxygen after carbon monoxide poisoning. The hyperbaric oxygen treatment eliminates carbon dioxide from the brain, while the standard oxygen treatment normalizes carboxyhemoglobin levels. Another preventative measure one can take is to be on bed rest and abstain from stressful and strenuous procedures for the first 10 days after an extended hypoxic event. Expectation and recognition will also lead to an earlier and more accurate and appropriate use of health care services.

== Prognosis ==
Those patients who survive initial hospitalization are likely to recover from Grinker's Myelinopathy, but may take up to a year or longer. Age seems to be a factor in the time for recovery, as one study indicated that the mean age of patients who recovered within one year was 10 years younger than that of patients who did not. For most patients, a recovery time of 3–6 months is typical. Even after recovering, however, some symptoms may persist, including cognitive deficits or Parkinsonian symptoms that can be treated separately.
