= Factitious airs =

Historical science of gases

Factitious airs (also factitious air or artificial airs) was a term used in 17th- to early 19th-century pneumatic chemistry for any gas, then called an "elastic fluid", that could be artificially produced from solid or liquid bodies by chemical reaction, fermentation, putrefaction, distillation, dissolution, or heat.

The phrase was coined by Robert Boyle around 1670 while isolating what is now recognized as hydrogen (which he termed "inflammable air").

== Background ==
The term was rigorously defined by Henry Cavendish in his landmark 1766 paper Three papers, containing experiments on factitious air. Cavendish described factitious air as "any kind of air which is contained in other bodies in an unelastic state, and is produced from thence by art". At the time, these gases were understood to be distinct from ordinary atmospheric air and were rarely obtained in pure form; archaic nomenclature was therefore inconsistent and often applied overlapping or mistaken labels to the same substance.

The study of factitious airs encompassed what are now known as hydrogen ("inflammable air"), carbon dioxide ("fixed air" or "fixable air"), ammonia ("alkaline air" or "volatile alkali"), oxygen ("dephlogisticated air", "vital air", or "oxygene"), nitrous oxide ("dephlogisticated nitrous air"), nitric oxide ("nitrous air"), carbon monoxide ("hydrocarbonate" or "water gas"), methane ("marsh gas" or "carburetted hydrogen"), hydrogen sulfide ("hepatic air"), and several others. These investigations were central to the development of pneumatic chemistry, the refinement and eventual overthrow of phlogiston theory, and the Chemical Revolution led by Antoine Lavoisier. The same body of work also laid the foundation for pneumatic medicine, most notably through the efforts of Thomas Beddoes and James Watt at the Pneumatic Institution in the 1790s, where factitious airs were trialed as treatments for tuberculosis and other conditions.

With the widespread acceptance of Lavoisier’s oxygen theory and the new chemical nomenclature in the late 1780s and 1790s, the archaic term "factitious airs" gradually fell out of use.

== Definition ==
Factitious means "artificial, not natural", so the term means "man-made gases".

An archaic definition from 1747 for the production of factitious air was defined as being caused by: "1- by flow Degrees from Putrefactions and Fermentations of all Kinds; or 2- more expeditiously by some Sorts of chymical Dissolutions of Bodies; or 3- and lastly, almost instantaneously by the Explosion of Gunpowder, and the Mixture or some Kinds of Bodies. Thus, if Paste or Dough with Leaven be placed in an exhausted Receiver, it will, after some Time, by Fermentation, produce a considerable quantity of Air, which will appear very plainly by the Sinking the Quicksilver in the Gage. Thus also any Animal or Vegetable Substance, putrifying in Vacuo, will produce the same Effect."

== Therapeutics ==
The therapeutic potential of factitious airs were widely investigated with significant contributions by Thomas Beddoes, James Watt, Humphry Davy, and others at the Pneumatic Institution. Other physicians interested in therapeutic applications of factitious airs included Tiberius Cavallo, James Lind, Loftus Wood, and others.

Georgiana Cavendish, Duchess of Devonshire (related to Henry through marriage) had a profound interest in chemistry with interest in Henry's research in pneumatic chemistry. She played a pivotal role in advancing the study of factitious airs through partnering with Thomas Beddoes to establish the Pneumatic Institution.

Tuberculosis was a primary disease physicians had attempted to treat with factitious airs, particularly since James Watt's daughter died of the disease. John Carmichael had reported successfully treating a patient suffering from tuberculosis using hydrocarbonate (syngas / water gas, unrelated to HCO_{3}^{-}). This application of this factitious air was pioneering research relevant to the modern era as carbon monoxide currently has preclinical evidence of treating Mycobacterium tuberculosis infection progression by inducing dormancy, stimulating host immune response, and ameliorating host inflammation.

== Historical Names ==
There are significant inconsistencies in the ancient nomenclature due to the limited knowledge of chemistry and primitive analytical technology of the era (i.e. based on the chemistry, it is clear the terms were mistakenly assigned to more than one gas by different investigators). Furthermore, in most cases the gases were not pure. Historical names used for factitious airs may have included:

=== Ammonia ===
The name ammonia originates from sal ammoniacus which may have been named from the temple of Jupiter Ammon in Siwa Oasis, ancient Libya, where it was prepared from camel dung. Dioscorides claimed the same site is the origin of ammoniacum. The name ammonia was coined by Torbern Bergman in 1782. In 1785, Claude Louis Berthollet ascertained its composition.

Liquid ammonia has been known since Raymond Lully in the thirteenth century. Gaseous ammonia was first isolated by Joseph Black in 1756 by reacting sal ammoniac (ammonium chloride) with calcined magnesia (magnesium oxide). It was isolated again by Peter Woulfe in 1767, by Carl Wilhelm Scheele in 1770, and Joseph Priestley in 1773.

- ammoniac
  - "the volatile alkali in its pure state"
  - later known as ammoniacal
- alkaline air
  - Term used by Joseph Priestley in 1773 upon isolation of ammonia.
- Other historical names: gaseous ammonia, azoturetted hydrogen, volatile alkali, ammonical gas, and others.

=== Carbon Dioxide ===
==== Fixed Air ====
Fixed air, or fixible air, is an ancient term for carbon dioxide

Joseph Priestley credited Joseph Black for discovering and coining "fixed air", which was thought to exist in a fixed state in alkaline salts, chalk, and other calcareous substances. Black considered substances containing fixed air to be "mild", and upon expulsion of the gas by heating the resulting state is "caustic" by corroding or burning plants and animals (e.g. CO_{2} released by chalk upon decomposition to calcium oxide). In other words, the fixed air (also known as fixible air) was thought to be affixed to a corrosive molecule.

Priestley likewise credited the discovery of fixed air to contributions from several scientists including: David Macbride, John Pringle, William Brownrigg (regarded carbonated water to have an acidulous taste), Stephen Hales, and many others.

Henry Cavendish provided a definition: "By fixed air, I mean that particular species of factitious air, which is separated from alkaline substances by solution in acids or by calcination". Cavendish essentially defined potassium oxide or calcium oxide as a base, which can contain air affixed within its composition, setting the stage for the historical definition of carbonate.

A synonym for fixed air originating from chalk (calcium carbonate) was known as chalky acid, or acid of chalk.

==== Carbonic Acid ====
According to Claude Louis Berthollet, "What has long been called fixed, or fixible air, being really an acid in the state of gas, has of late received several new denominations. It has been called aerial acid, as existing very readily in the state of air, or more properly of gas, and plentifully in the atmosphere. The chalky acid, as procurable in large quantities from chalk, or other mild calcareous substances. The name given to it in this essay is derived from the knowledge of its composition, as lately ascertained by the French Chemists to consist of the elementary part of charcoal, named charbone, or char, united with oxygen, or the acidifying principle. Hence it is called, with strict propriety, carbonic acid in general; carbonic acid gas when in the aerial form; and carbonic acid liquor when combined with or dissolved in water."

By French Chemists, Berthollet is generally referring to Lavoisier's oxidation discoveries. The name oxygen is derived from Greek with oxy meaning acid, and gene to mean forming/expression, therefore carbonic acid is simply the union of carbon with oxygen (Laviosier's original degrees of oxidation could not fit the concept of carbon monoxide as it was based on diamond, graphite, coal and carbonic acid)

The 1804 definition by John Sadler of the Pneumatic Institution is, "A peculiar elastic fluid possessed of acid properties, formerly called fixed air, produced when charcoal or diamond is burned in oxygene; it is carbon perfectly oxygenated. It contains carbon 1, oxygene 4.

===== Carbonic acid gas =====
Carbonic acid gas was an ancient term to specify the gaseous state of carbonic acid (i.e. the term is synonymous and interchangeable with carbonic acid despite explicitly describing the gaseous state). It is listed as an alternative name for carbon dioxide in PubChem. In 1796 externally applied carbonic acid gas to the epidermis was reported to treat breast cancer; and inhalation treated tuberculosis and other indications. Henry Hill Hickman evaluated carbonic acid gas (produced by mixing sulfuric acid with carbonate of lime) for a surgical anesthetic.

==== Carbonate ====
Carbonate was defined as "a compound formed by the union of carbonic acid with an earth, alkali, or metallic oxide [...] they are distinguished by the property of effervescing on the addition of an acid" The definition expands upon fixed air being affixed within carbonate to suggest carbonic acid is a constituent of carbonate (i.e. carbonate is a salt of CO_{2} 'carbonic acid' and a base), therefore in the ancient language the suffix "-ic acid" and "-ate" were not interchangeable.

In 1857, the molecular formula for carbonate "salts" were written to as:

- NaO,CO_{2} (carbonate of soda - written as NaO since the exact formula of Na_{2}O was unknown at the time)
- CaO,CO_{2} (carbonate of lime)
- MgO,CO_{2} (carbonate of magnesia)
- Other examples: BaO,CO_{2}, PbO,CO_{2}, FeO,CO_{2}

The modern definition is similar, although equipped with the molecular knowledge of carbonate's structure (CO_{3}^{-2}) and reassignment of the meaning of carbonic acid from CO_{2} to the H_{2}CO_{3} molecule, "Carbonates are the salts of carbonic acids. They form when a positively charged metal ion comes into contact with the oxygen atoms of the carbonate ion such a NaHCO_{3} and Na_{2}CO_{3}."

==== Bicarbonate ====
Bicarbonate, originally known as bi-carbonate of potash, was coined by William Hyde Wollaston in 1814 based on the empirical observation that HCO_{3}^{-} releases twice the amount of carbon dioxide (referred to as carbonic acid at the time) compared to CO_{3}^{2-}.

In the experiment, Wollaston observed CO_{2} liberated from potassium hydrocarbonate (initially known as carbonate of potash, suggested by Wollaston to be named bicarbonate) followed by CO_{2} released from potassium carbonate (vaguely known as subcarbonate, suggested to be named carbonate) upon formation of potash (potassium oxide).

Bicarbonates have historically been defined as, "combinations of the bases with the carbonic acid, in which two atoms of the latter are united to one of the former".

In 1857, the molecular formula for bicarbonate "salts" were written as:

- NaO,2CO_{2} (bicarbonate of soda - written as NaO since the exact formula, Na_{2}O, was unknown at the time)
- KO,2CO_{2} (bicarbonate of potash - written as KO since the formula of potash, K_{2}O, was unknown at the time)
- CaO,2CO_{2} (bicarbonate of lime)

In other words, potash (potassium oxide) was well-understood to be a caustic base and essentially the core molecule that subsequent chemical nomenclature was built upon. Carbonate of potash (potassium carbonate) must contain a carbonic acid species affixed to potash's structure (see fixed air above). Since "bi-carbonate of potash" liberates a double dose of carbonic acid, to distinguish between the similar substances, the prefix bi- indicates the bi-carbonate of potash (potassium hydrocarbonate) contains twice as much CO_{2} affixed to potash's structure relative to the carbonate of potash.

A hypothetical analogy for the naming of bicarbonate would an experiment of heating two crystalline molecules such as pseudopolymorphs of azithromycin, and measuring twice the water content in a dihydrate compared to a (mono)hydrate and subsequently assigning the prefix di- for the empirical observation (i.e. dihydrate of azithromycin).

The same ancient logic (prior to the understanding of molecular formulas and reaction stoichiometry) applied to soda, carbonate of soda, and bicarbonate of soda.

The word saleratus, from Latin sal æratus (meaning "aerated salt"), was a widely used name for bicarbonate beginning in the 1840s. Aerated salt aligns with the historical context of bicarbonate naming since aerial acid is another CO_{2} synonym.

==== Miscellaneous historical names ====
- gas silvestre
  - Ancient origin for fixed air by Jan Baptist van Helmont
  - gas produced from fermenting and effervescing substances.
- Other historical names: Spiritus sylvestris, vinous gas, calcareous gas, acid of air, luft-saeure, carbonic anhydride, Gas acide carbonique, Gas carbonicum, kriedesaeure, kohlensaeures gas, choke-damp, cretaceous acid, Acide mephitique, Mephitic air, deutoxide of carbon

=== Carbon monoxide ===
- Friedrich Hoffmann wrote about carbon monoxide in 1716.
- hydrocarbonate
  - Water gas prepared by passing steam over charcoal/coke. Alternatively prepared from unspecified alcohol and sulphuric acid.
  - Hydrocarbonate was recognized to brighten venous blood and compete with oxygen around 1796, although credit is widely awarded to Claude Bernard's work in the mid-1850s.
- carbonic oxide / protoxide
  - William Cruickshank discovered the composition of carbon monoxide and named it gaseous oxide of carbon. Cruickshank recognized water and hydrogen were not a constituent of the combustible base which contained the same ingredients as carbonic acid, although containing less oxygen.
  - Carbonic oxide was identified in the intestine of cattle in the 1800s, marking a trace origin for endogenous carbon monoxide.
  - John Sadler's 1804 definition reads, "An inflammable elastic fluid, obtained by the action of ignited charcoal on some of the metallic oxides. It is carbon in its second degree of oxygenation, consisting of carbon 9, oxygen 21"
- carbonous oxyd
  - The name carbonous oxyd relative to carbonic acid was once considered analogous to nitrous oxide to nitric acid based on the oxide not having sufficient oxygen to form the acid.
- Other historical names: gaseous oxide of carbon, hydrocarbonous acid, heavy inflammable air, carbonated hydrogene, oxycarburetted hydrogen (water gas)

=== Hydrogen ===
Hydrogen was initially thought to be toxic based on experiments by Lavoisier, however, the purity of the hydrogen was taken into question when later experiments discovered hydrogen to effectively treat measles in the 1790s.

- factitious air (Boyle)
- hydro-gene
  - means "water former" from hydro- and gene-
- hydrogene gas
  - Inflammable air; a very light elastic fluid, produced by the action of water on ignited iron or zinc.
- Other historical names: inflammable air, inflammable gas, base of inflammable air, zincic inflammable air, martial inflammable air
- Explored for incandescence and electrochemistry upon reacting with platina sponge is 1823

=== Hydrogen sulfide ===
- sulphurated hydrogene
  - historical knowledge traces back to ancient Greece.
  - therapeutic application of hydrogen sulfide for gastrointestinal disorders dates as early as 1806
  - Regarded as having the fetid odour of putrid eggs.
  - Can be produced using a Wedgwood tube consisting of a gun barrel heated over a furnace, filled with sulfur and hydrogene gas passing through.
- hepatic air, extensively studied by Richard Kirwan
- hydrogenated sulfur

=== Hydrogen disulfide ===
- supersulphuretted hydrogene

=== Sulfur dioxide ===
- Vitriolic acid gas

=== Methane ===
- marsh gas / marsh air
- Other historical names: carburetted hydrogen, light carburetted hydrogen, heavy inflammable air, dicarburet of hydrogen, fire-damp, gas of the acetates

=== Nitrogen ===
- azot, or azotic air. Azote – means lifeless, or a-zote for "not life", generally regarded as the solid constituent whereas azotic gas was the gaseous form.
- Other historical names: phlogisticated air, atmospherical memphitic gas, mephitis, nitrogene, base of mephitis, stickstoffgas,

=== Nitric oxide ===
- nitrous gas

=== Nitrous oxide ===
- Robert Harrington was a skeptic of laughing gas research at the Pneumatic Institution and criticized Humphry Davy and Thomas Beddoes as "aerial flying chemists" with their "ecstatic, lunatic, and Leputatic sensations".
- Other historical names: dephlogisticated nitrous air, protoxide of nitrogen, hypo-nitrous oxide, gaseous oxide of azote, nitrous oxide,

=== Nitrogen dioxide ===
- nitrous acid gas
- Deutoxide of azote
- Discovered by Priestley. Used by James Freeman Dana, Alessandro Volta, Joseph Louis Gay-Lussac, Andrew Ure and others in eudiometery to study the atmosphere.

=== Oxygen ===
Blood has been understood to absorb and deliver oxygen since the mid-1790s. Oxy-gene means acid-former or acid-expression, once thought all acids contained oxygen.

- oxygene gas
  - An elastic fluid, constituting that part of the air of the atmosphere necessary for combustion and animal life. It is the supposed principle of acidity of the French chemists.
- Other historical names: vital air, highly respirable air, pure air, phosoxygen, dephlogisticated air, empyreal air, base of vital air,

=== Miscellaneous ===
- animal inflammable air
- Phosphane / Phosphine
  - Phosphotetted Hydrogene discovered by Gengembre, odor of putrid fish.
- hydrochloric acid
  - marine acid gas
- chlorine gas
  - dephlogisticated marine acid gas
- fulmination gases

== See also ==
- Chemical revolution
