= Gas appliance =

Appliance powered by combusting a fuel gas

A gas appliance is any appliance that uses natural gas, propane, or hydrogen as its power source rather than electricity. They are commonly used for space heating, water heating, and cooking.

== Cooking appliances ==
Many cooking appliances rely on gas as a power source, including gas ovens and gas stoves. Gas ovens were patented by British inventor James Sharp in 1836, and had become commonplace by the 1920s.

== Water heater ==
Water heating

== Heater ==
- fan heater
- Central heating
- heat pump
- air conditioner
- fireplace
- Gas heater

== Clothes Dryer ==
- Clothes dryer
