= Samuel More (apothecary) =

Apothecary and administrator (1726–1799)

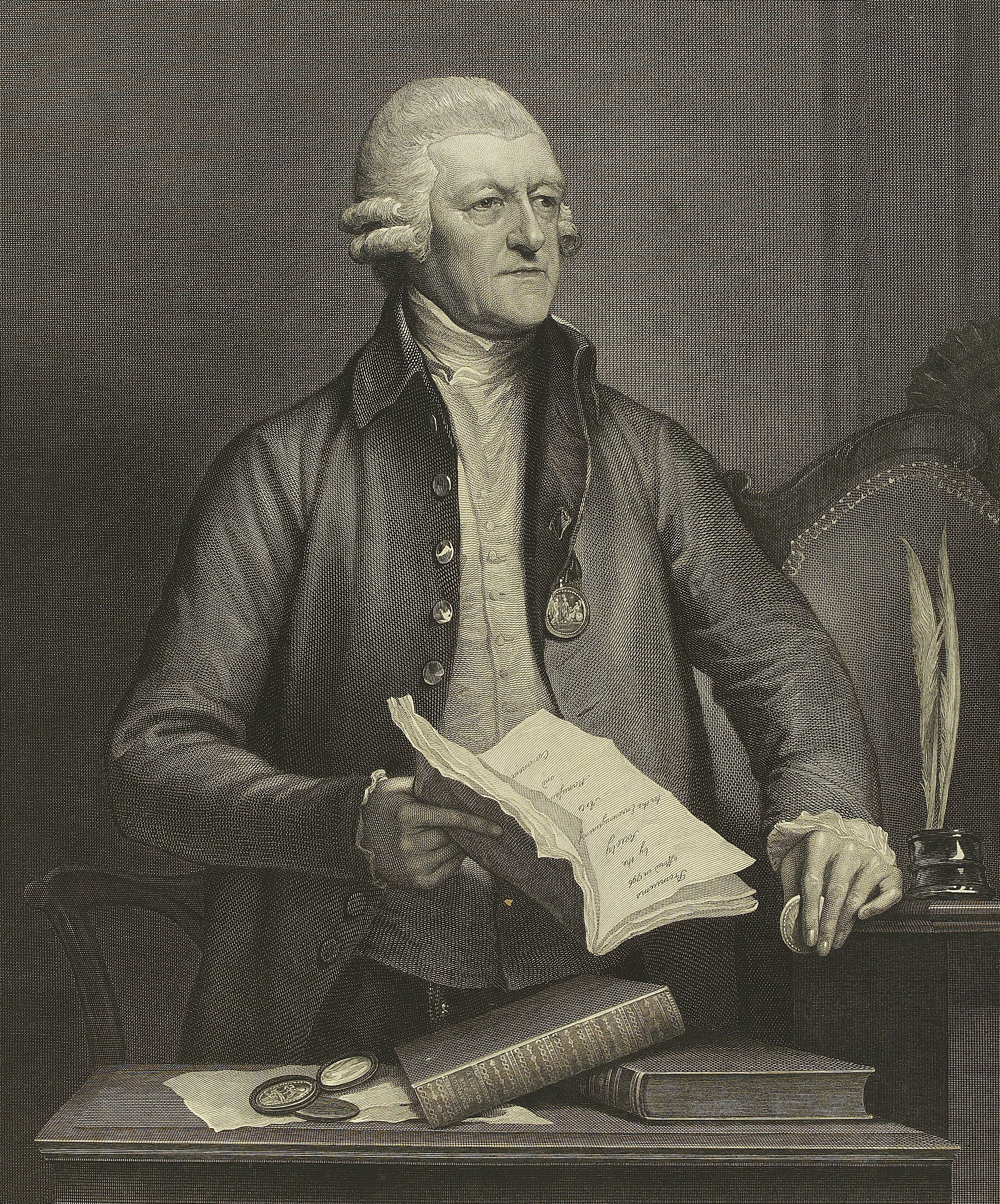
Engraving of More, published in 1798

Samuel More (30 November 1726 – 11 October 1799) was an English apothecary and administrator associated with the Society of Arts, Manufactures, and Commerce.

== Biography ==
Samuel More was born in Westminster, England, the fifth and third surviving child of Samuel More (1682–1731), a schoolmaster from a family of distinguished writing masters, and his wife, Mary Berry (1690–1744) of Kensington. Born to a schoolmaster and his wife, More was educated by his father in his early years. More went on to apprentice under an apothecary in Whitechapel and afterwards opened his own business with his family inheritance. Notably, he cured the incapacitated hands of a dyer's apprentice thereby earning himself an election to the Society of Arts, Manufactures, and Commerce in May 1761. He served as chairman of the committee of chemistry, and in all other main committees, becoming very popular within the society. His popularity earned him the office of Secretary in 1769, which involved running in yearly elections against candidates who would often run smear campaigns in the newspaper. Despite this, due to his tireless work ethic and widespread popularity, More remained in his position as secretary for the remainder of his life. His role allowed him to cultivate relationships with numerous peers in scientific and industrial circles, who frequently sought his counsel on technical issues. His renowned expertise led him to be summoned as witness in various high-profile trials and committees, such as the Richard Arkwright patent trials that persisted throughout the 1780s. He was elected as a member to the American Philosophical Society in 1774.

After years of good health, he began to suffer intense flare-ups of gout before dying at his home in London in 1799.
