= Roy Richard Grinker =

American anthropologist

- Born: 1961 (age 64–65)
- Education: Grinnell College (B.A. 1983); Harvard (M.A. 1985); Harvard (Ph.D. 1989)
- Occupations: Author, professor

Roy Richard Grinker (born 1961) is an American author and professor of anthropology, international affairs, and human sciences at The George Washington University.

Grinker is an authority on North and South Korean relations. As part of his PhD research, he spent two years living with the Lese farmers and the Efé pygmies in the northeastern Democratic Republic of the Congo as a Fulbright scholar. He has also conducted epidemiological research on autism in Korea.

Grinker is the editor of Anthropological Quarterly. He has also written op-ed articles for the New York Times and appeared as a guest on PBS NewsHour.

His latest book, Nobody's Normal: How Culture Created the Stigma of Mental Illness, was included in the New York Time's editor's choice list for the week of February 4, 2021.

== Publications ==
Grinker has published a number of books on multiple topics - Africa, Korea, and autism.

- Houses in the Rainforest: Ethnicity and Inequality among Farmers and Foragers in Northeastern Zaire (ISBN 0520089758, University of California Press, 1994)
- (with Christopher B. Steiner) Perspectives on Africa: A Reader in Culture, History and Representation (ISBN 1557866864, Blackwell Publishers, 1997)
- Korea and its Futures: Unification and the Unfinished War (ISBN 0312224729, St. Martin's Press, 1998)
- In the Arms of Africa: The Life of Colin Turnbull (ISBN 0226309045, University of Chicago Press, 2000)
- Unstrange Minds: Remapping the World of Autism (ISBN 0465027636, Basic Books, 2007)
- Nobody's Normal: How Culture Created the Stigma of Mental Illness (ISBN 978-0-393-53164-0, 978-1-324-02013-4, Norton, 2021)

== Personal life ==
Grinker was born and raised in Chicago. He graduated from Choate Rosemary Hall in 1979, Grinnell College in 1983, and received his Ph.D. in Social Anthropology at Harvard University in 1989.

His paternal grandfather, Roy R. Grinker, Sr. founded the Psychiatry Department at the University of Chicago and was the founding editor of the Archives of General Psychiatry.

His book on autism, Unstrange Minds, was in part an "attempt to make sense of an intensely personal issue: his own daughter's autism".
