= Roy R. Grinker Sr. =

American neurologist and psychiatrist

Roy Richard Grinker Sr. (August 2, 1900 – May 9, 1993) was an American neurologist and psychiatrist, Professor of Psychiatry at University of Chicago, and pioneer in American psychiatry and psychosomatics.

== Biography ==
Grinker was born in Chicago, where his father was a neuropsychiatrist. He received a B.S. from the University of Chicago in 1919 and a M.D. in 1921 from Rush Medical College. Directly afterwards he spent a postgraduate year in Europe. In 1933 back in Europe he took psychoanalytic training with Sigmund Freud.

In 1927 Grinker started teaching at the University of Chicago. In World War II he served at the U.S. Army Medical Corps in North Africa, where with John P. Spiegel he wrote the book Men Under Stress. Back in Chicago in 1946 Grinker started at the Michael Reese Hospital as director of the Institute for Psychosomatic and Psychiatric Research and Training. and as analyst at the Chicago Institute for Psychoanalysis. From 1951 to 1969 he was clinical professor of psychiatry at the University of Illinois College of Medicine, and professor at Northwestern University. In 1969 became professor of psychiatry at the University of Chicago School of Medicine. Grinker was the chief editor of the American Medical Association's Archives of General Psychiatry for 17 years.

Grinker conducted the first systematic empirical investigation of the borderline syndrome and helped distinguish it from both schizophrenia and the neurotic disorders. His 1968 book with Beatrice Werble and Robert C. Drye, The Borderline Syndrome, was an important precursor to the modern diagnostic concept of borderline personality disorder and contributed to its recognition as a distinct clinical syndrome.

Grinker was the father of Roy R. Grinker Jr. and grandfather of Roy Richard Grinker (born 1961), Professor of Anthropology, International Affairs, and Human Sciences at The George Washington University. The neuropathological phenomenon Grinker myelinopathy is named after Grinker.

== Selected publications ==
- 1933. Grinker's Neurology
- 1946. Men under stress. with John P. Spiegel, Philadelphia: Blakiston. 1945.
- 1945. War Neuroses. with John P. Spiegel, Philadelphia: Blakiston, 1945.
- 1953. Psychosomatic Research. New York: Norton
- 1955. Anxiety and stress. With H. Basowitz, H. Persky, and S.J. Korchin
- 1961. The phenomena of depressions. With J. Miller, M. Sabshin, R. Nunn, and J.C. Nunnally
- 1967. Toward a Unified Theory of Human Behavior: An Introduction to General Systems Theory, with Helen MacGill Hughes, 390 pp.
- 1968. The borderline syndrome: A behavioral study of ego-functions With B. Werble & R.C. Drye
