= Thomas Beddoes =

British doctor (1760–1808)

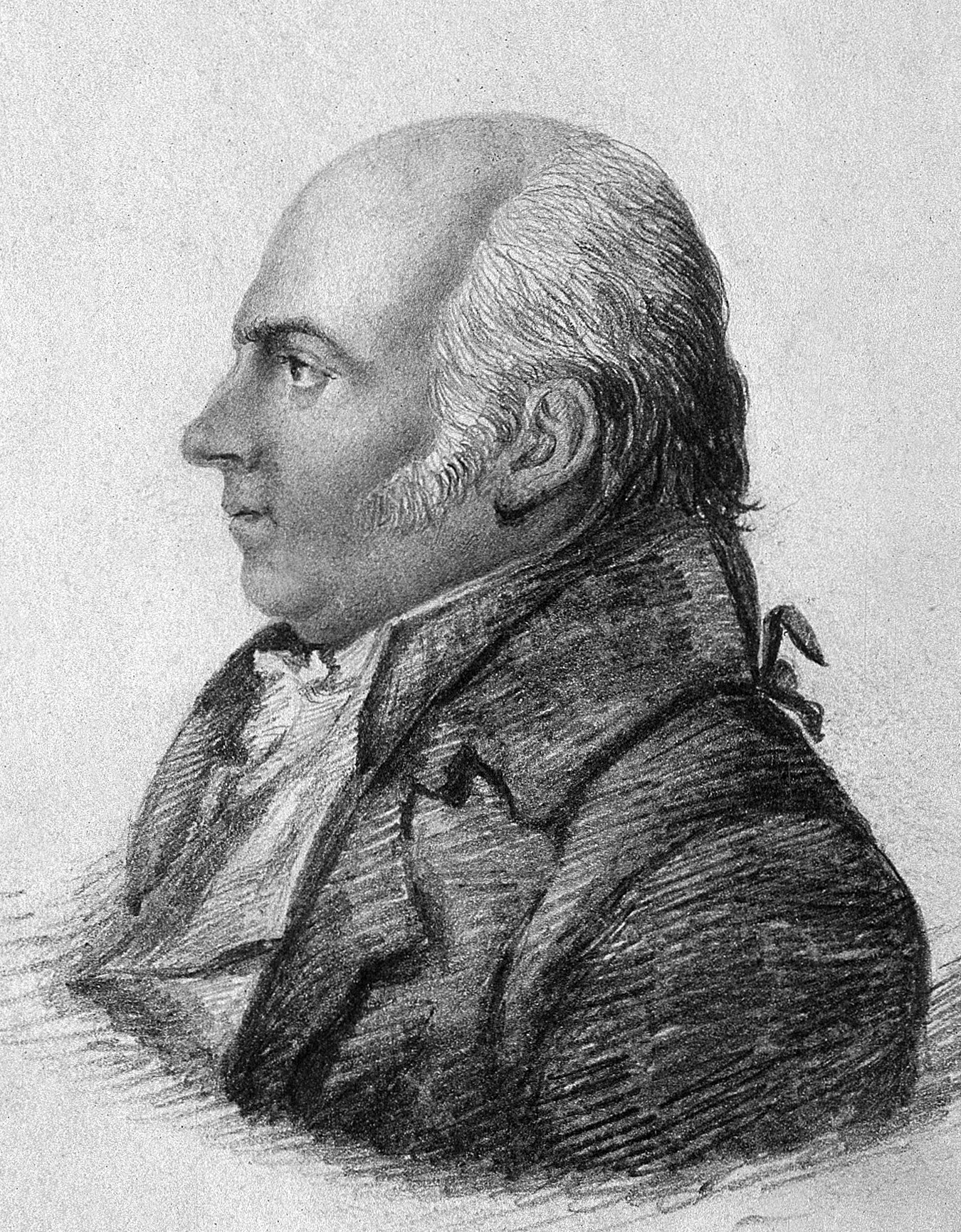
- Thomas Beddoes, pencil drawing by Edward Bird
- Born: 13 April 1760; Shifnal, England
- Died: 24 December 1808 (aged 48)
- Education: Bridgnorth Grammar School; Pembroke College, Oxford; University of Edinburgh
- Occupation: Physician
- Known for: History of Isaac Jenkins
- Spouse: Anna Maria Edgeworth 1773–1824
- Children: Thomas Lovell Beddoes

Thomas Beddoes (13 April 1760 – 24 December 1808) was an English physician and scientific writer. He was born in Shifnal, Shropshire and died in Bristol fifteen years after opening his medical practice there. He was a reforming practitioner and teacher of medicine, and an associate of leading scientific figures. He worked to treat tuberculosis.

Beddoes was a friend of Samuel Taylor Coleridge, and, according to E. S. Shaffer, an important influence on Coleridge's early thinking, introducing him to the higher criticism. The poet Thomas Lovell Beddoes was his son. A painting of him by Samson Towgood Roch is in the National Portrait Gallery, London.

== Early life and education ==
Beddoes was born in Shifnal, Shropshire, on April 13, 1760, at Balcony House. He was educated at Bridgnorth Grammar School and Pembroke College, Oxford. He enrolled in the University of Edinburgh's medical course in the early 1780s. There he was taught chemistry by Joseph Black and natural history by Kendall Walker. He also studied medicine in London under John Sheldon. In 1784 he published a translation of Lazzaro Spallanzani's Dissertations on Natural History, and in 1785 produced a translation, with original notes, of Torbern Olof Bergman's Essays on Elective Attractions.

He took his degree of doctor of medicine at Pembroke College, Oxford University, in 1786.

In 1794, he married Anna, daughter of his associate at the Bristol Pneumatic Institution, Richard Lovell Edgeworth. Their son, poet Thomas Lovell Beddoes, was born in 1803 in Bristol.

== Career ==
Beddoes visited Paris after 1786, where he became acquainted with Lavoisier. Beddoes was appointed professor of chemistry at Oxford University in 1788. His lectures attracted large and appreciative audiences; but his sympathy with the French Revolution excited a clamour against him, he resigned his readership in 1792.

Beddoes was a prolific writer from the early 1790s through the 1810s. In January 1792 he wrote his Letter on Early Instruction, Particularly that of the Poor, which described how injustice and oppression provoked mob violence. He believed it was necessary to humanise the “minds of the poorer class of Citizens,” which would involve education, the improvement of material conditions, the removal of abuses, and the denouncement of violence. In the following year he published the History of Isaac Jenkins, a story which powerfully exhibits the evils of drunkenness, and of which 40,000 copies are reported to have been sold. In 1796, Beddoes published An Essay on the Public Merits of Mr. Pitt, which criticised Britain’s prime minister William Pitt’s domestic and foreign policies during the Seven Years’ War with France. He saw Pitts’s policies as ignorant about the conditions of the poor and negligent of the useful applications of scientific knowledge.

Beddoes also advocated for medical reform, attacking the widespread lay practices of self-medication, which he believed were the cause of many unnecessary deaths. Through his writings, Beddoes promoted public education on healthy living, exercise, and public health issues such as tuberculosis. Beddoes also felt that valuable scientific observations and data were going to waste. He actively argued for creating a centrally organised system for collecting, indexing and distributing important medical data to the physicians' community. He proposed a national organisation for preventive medicine upon seeing the worsening condition of the poor and the large number of patients at his pneumatic institution.

Beddoes addressed tuberculosis, seeking treatments for the disease. He had a clinic in Bristol from 1793 to 1799 and later began the Pneumatic Institution to test various gases for the treatment of tuberculosis. The institution was later changed to a general hospital.

Beddoes wrote more than thirty books, pamphlets, and articles urging these reforms and ideological changes. As an advocate of public health measures and reforms at a time when England lagged behind France in organised medicine, he believed his responsibility as a physician was to prevent disease through understanding and tackling its social, material, and physiological causes.

=== Hope Square, Bristol ===
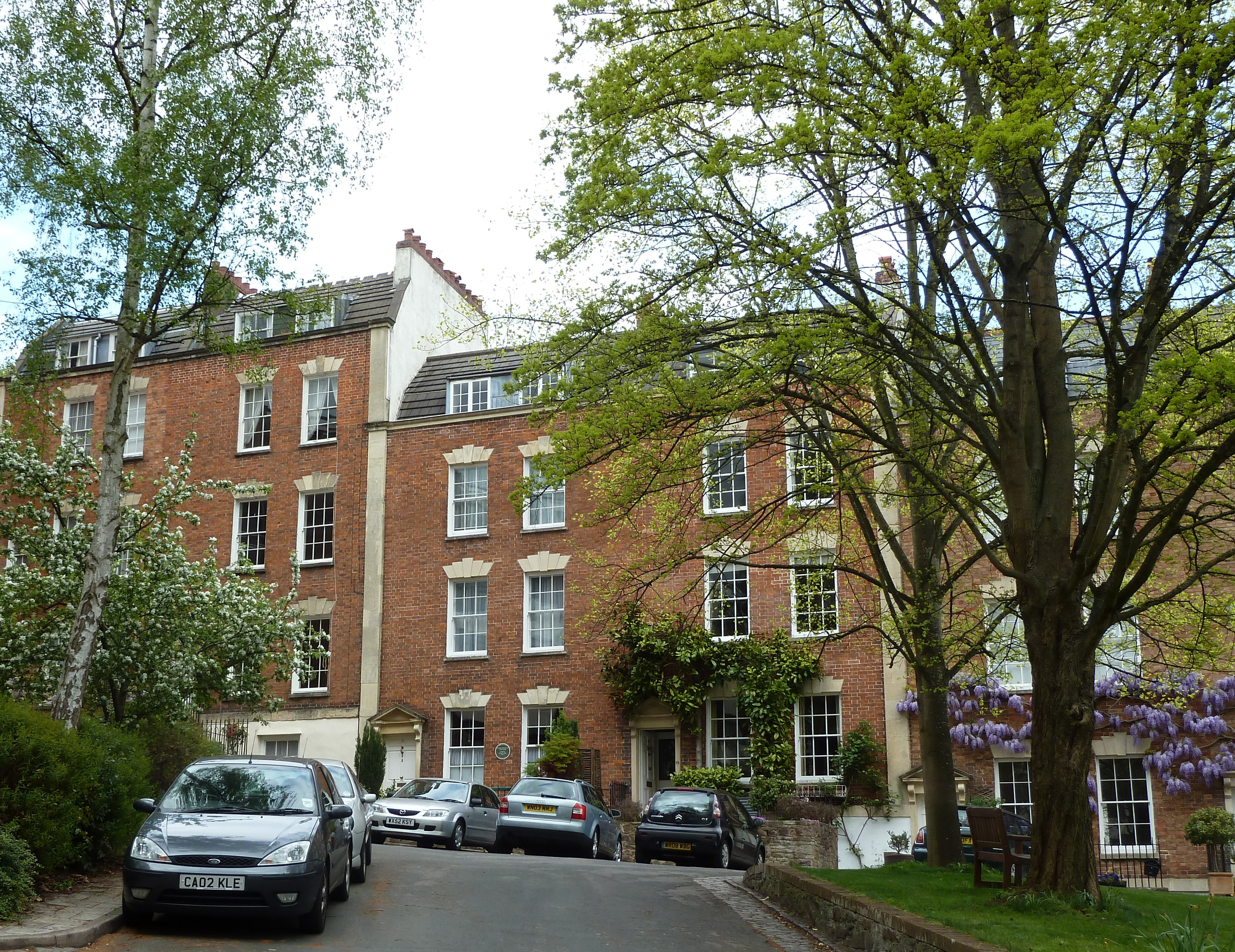
Beddoes's first tuberculosis clinic in Bristol, at Hope Square

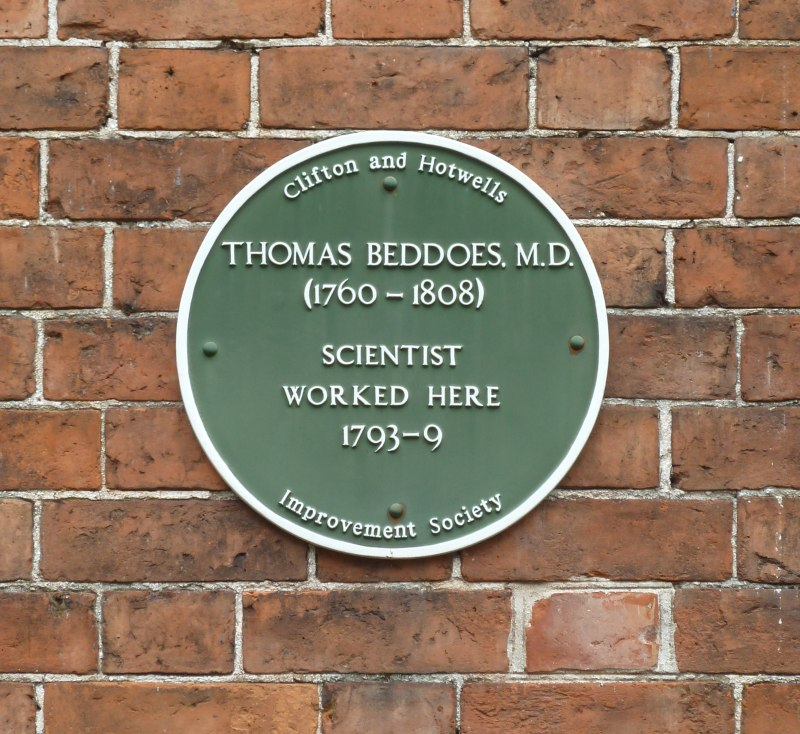
Plaque to Beddoes in Hope Square

Between 1793 and 1799 Beddoes had a clinic at Hope Square, Hotwells in Bristol where he treated patients with tuberculosis. On the principle that butchers seemed to suffer less from tuberculosis than others, he kept cows in a byre alongside the building and encouraged them to breathe on his patients. This became the source of local ridicule, amongst claims that animals were kept in the clinic's bedrooms, against the protests of landlords.

Despite the link he saw between proximity to cows and lower incidence of tuberculosis, he remained sceptical when Edward Jenner began using a cow-derived vaccination for smallpox a few years later.

=== Bristol Pneumatic Institution ===
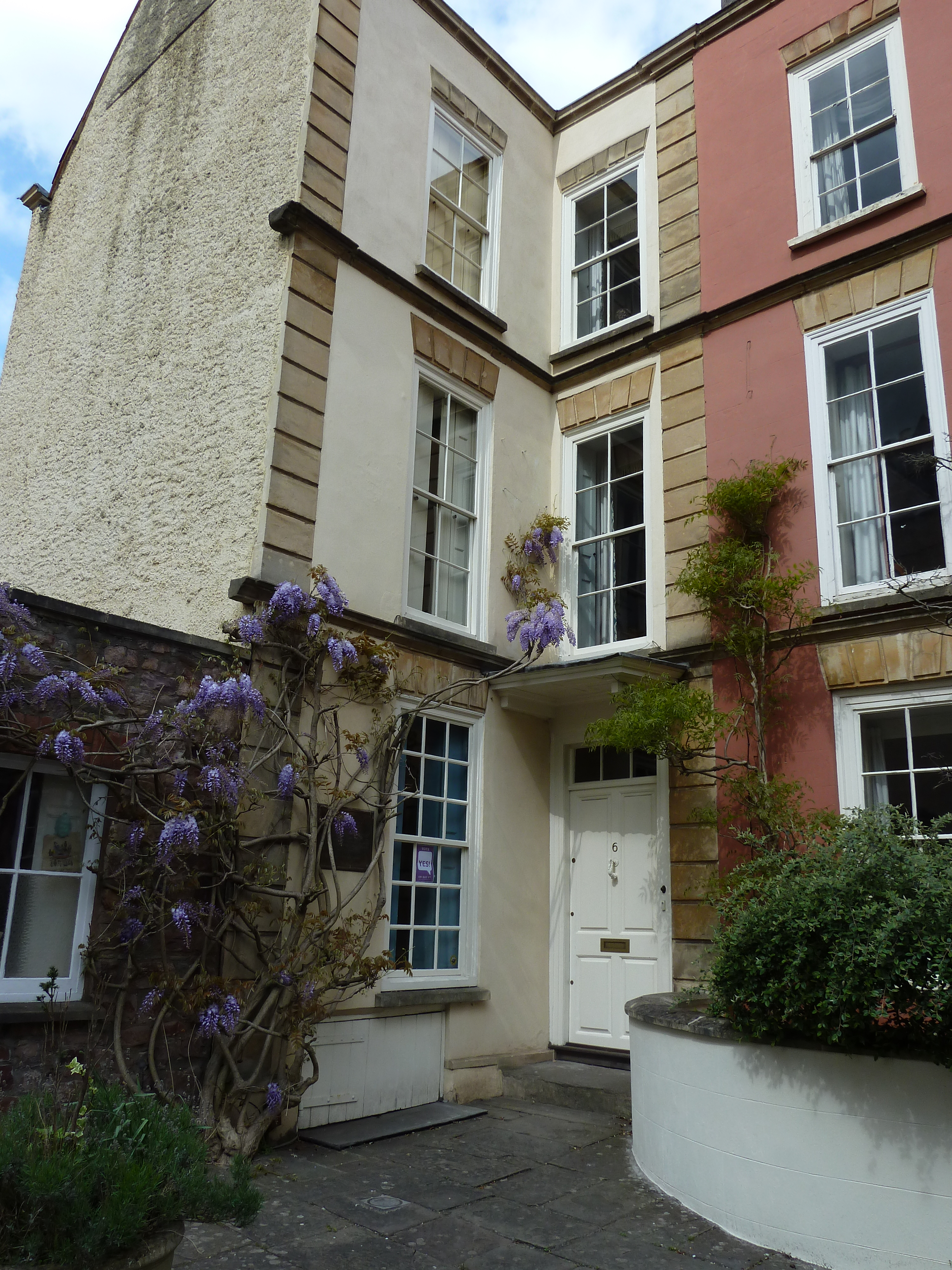
Pneumatic Institution premises, 6 Dowry Square, with 7 to the right

While living in Hotwells he began work on a project to establish an institution for treating disease by the inhalation of different gases, which he called pneumatic medicine.

He was assisted by Richard Lovell Edgeworth. In 1799 the Pneumatic Institution was established at Dowry Square, Hotwells. Its first superintendent was Humphry Davy, who investigated the properties of nitrous oxide in its laboratory. The original aim of the institution was gradually abandoned; it became a general hospital, and was relinquished by its founder in the year before his death. By the time Beddoes retired from practice in 1807, he estimated that his institution had treated over ten thousand patients.

Beddoes was a man of great powers and wide acquirements, which he directed to noble and philanthropic purposes. He strove to effect social good by popularizing medical knowledge, a work for which his vivid imagination and glowing eloquence eminently fitted him.

— Encyclopedia Britannica (1911),

== Political beliefs ==
Beddoes became an outspoken supporter of the French Revolution in its early years. He considered the republic the best political system, having observed the corruption and partisanship of the British Parliament. However, even while sympathising with democratic protest, Beddoes feared popular insurrection and mob violence.

Beddoes was a friend of several members of the Lunar Society of Birmingham, a society of prominent Enlightenment figures. Following the Priestley Riots of 1791, Beddoes publicly voiced his opposition to the 'Church and King' riots, his sympathies with France, his admiration for French scientists and social scientists, and his opposition to the war on France. In 1792, he was investigated by the Home Office on suspicions of "sowing sedition" by distributing political pamphlets that spoke out against the establishment and for his connections to the Lunar Society and allegedly, Erasmus Darwin's Derby Philosophical Society.

== Selected writings ==
Besides the writings mentioned above, Beddoes was also associated with the following:

- Chemical Essays by Carl Wilhelm Scheele (1786) translator
- An Account of some Appearances attending the Conversion of cast into malleable Iron. In a Letter from Thomas Beddoes, M.D. to Sir Joseph Banks, Bart. P.R.S. (Phil. Trans. Royal Society, 1791)
- Observations on the Nature and Cure of Calculus, Sea Scurvy, Consumption, Catarrah, and Fever: Together with Conjectures Upon Several Other Subjects of Physiology and Pathology. J. Murray. 1793.
- Observations on the nature of demonstrative evidence: with an explanation of certain difficulties occurring in the elements of geometry, and reflections on language. J. Johnson. 1793.
- Political Pamphlets (1795–1797)
- Contributions to physical and medical knowledge, principally from the West of England, collected by Thomas Beddoes, M.D. Paternoster-Row, London: printed by Biggs & Cottle, for T. N. Longman and O. Rees. 1799. In this work (p. 4), Beddoes makes the first recorded use of the word Biology in its modern sense.
- Essay on Consumption (1799)
- Essay on Fever (1807)
- Hygëia: Or, Essays Moral and Medical on the Causes Affecting the Personal State of Our Middling and Affluent Classes. Phillips. 1802.

Beddoes edited the second edition of John Brown's Elements of Medicine (1795), and also translated a selection of Johann Karl August Musäus's Volksmärchen der Deutschen into English as Popular Tales of the Germans (1791).
