= Ethylene (plant hormone) =

Alkene gas naturally regulating the plant growth

An ethylene signal transduction pathway. Ethylene permeates the cell membrane and binds to a gasoreceptor on the endoplasmic reticulum. The gasoreceptor releases the repressed EIN2. This then activates a signal transduction pathway which activates regulatory genes that eventually trigger an ethylene response. The activated DNA is transcribed into mRNA which is then translated into a functional enzyme that is used for ethylene biosynthesis.

Ethylene (CH_{2}=CH_{2}) is an unsaturated hydrocarbon gas (alkene) acting as a naturally occurring plant hormone. It is the simplest alkene gas and is the first gas known to act as a hormone. It acts at trace levels throughout the life of the plant by stimulating or regulating the ripening of fruit, the opening of flowers, the abscission (or shedding) of leaves and, in aquatic and semi-aquatic species, promoting the 'escape' from submergence by means of rapid elongation of stems or leaves. This escape response is particularly important in rice farming. Commercial fruit-ripening rooms use "catalytic generators" to make ethylene gas from a liquid supply of ethanol. Typically, a gassing level of 500 to 2,000 ppm is used, for 24 to 48 hours. Care must be taken to control carbon dioxide levels in ripening rooms when gassing, as high temperature ripening (20 °C; 68 °F) has been seen to produce CO_{2} levels of 10% in 24 hours.

== History ==
Ethylene has a long history of use in agriculture. Ancient Egyptians would gash figs in order to stimulate ripening (wounding stimulates ethylene production by plant tissues). The ancient Chinese would burn incense in closed rooms to enhance the ripening of pears. In the 19th century, city dwellers noticed that gas leaks from street lights led to stunting of growth, death of flowers and premature leaf fall. In 1874, it was discovered that smoke caused pineapple fields to bloom. Smoke contains ethylene, and once this was realized the smoke was replaced with ethephon or naphthalene acetic acid, which induce ethylene production.

The scientific study of ethylene as a factor in plant physiology started in the late 19th century. In 1896, Russian botanist Dimitry Neljubow studied the response of peas to illuminating gas to which they showed movement. He discovered ethylene as the active component in the light source that stimulated pea behaviour. He reported his discovery in 1901. Sarah Doubt also showed in 1917 that ethylene from illuminating gas stimulated abscission. Farmers in Florida would commonly get their crops to ripen in sheds by lighting kerosene lamps, which was originally thought to induce ripening from the heat. In 1924, Frank E. Denny discovered that it was the molecule ethylene emitted by the kerosene lamps that induced the ripening. Reporting in the Botanical Gazette, he wrote:

Ethylene was very effective in bringing about the desired result, concentrations as low as one part (by volume) of ethylene in one million parts of air being sufficient to cause green lemons to turn yellow in about six to ten days... Furthermore, coloring with either ethylene or gas from the kerosene stoves caused the loss of the "buttons" (calyx, receptacle, and a portion of the peduncle)... Yellowing of the ethylene treated fruit became visible about the third or fourth day, and full yellow color was developed in six to ten days. Untreated fruit remained green during the same period of time.

The same year, Denny published the experimental details separately, and also experimentally showed that use of ethylene was more advantageous than that of kerosene. In 1934, British biologist Richard Gane discovered that the chemical constituent in ripe bananas could cause ripening of green bananas, as well as faster growth of pea. He showed that the same growth effect could be induced by ethylene. Reporting in Nature that ripe fruit (in this case Worcester Pearmain apple) produced ethylene he said:

The amount of ethylene produced [by the apple] is very small—perhaps of the order of 1 cubic centimetre during the whole life-history of the fruit; and the cause of its prodigious biological activity in such small concentration is a problem for further research. Its production by apple ceases or is very much reduced in the absence of oxygen.

He subsequently showed that ethylene was produced by other fruits as well, and that obtained from apple could induce seed germination and plant growth in different vegetables (but not in cereals). His conclusions were not universally accepted by other scientists. They became more convincing when William Crocker, Alfred Hitchcock, and Percy Zimmerman reported in 1935 that ethylene acts similar to auxins in causing plant growth and senescence of vegetative tissues. This established that ethylene is a plant hormone.

== Ethylene biosynthesis in plants ==
The Yang cycle

Ethylene is produced from essentially all parts of higher plants, including leaves, stems, roots, flowers, fruits, tubers, and seeds. Ethylene production is regulated by a variety of developmental and environmental factors. During the life of the plant, ethylene production is induced during certain stages of growth such as germination, ripening of fruits, abscission of leaves, and senescence of flowers. Ethylene production can also be induced by a variety of external aspects such as mechanical wounding, environmental stresses, and certain chemicals including auxin and other regulators. The pathway for ethylene biosynthesis is named the Yang cycle after the scientist Shang Fa Yang who made key contributions to elucidating this pathway.

Ethylene is biosynthesized from the amino acid methionine to S-adenosyl-L-methionine (SAM, also called Adomet) by the enzyme Met adenosyltransferase. SAM is then converted to 1-aminocyclopropane-1-carboxylic acid (ACC) by the enzyme ACC synthase (ACS). The activity of ACS determines the rate of ethylene production, therefore regulation of this enzyme is key for the ethylene biosynthesis. The final step requires oxygen and involves the action of the enzyme ACC-oxidase (ACO), formerly known as the ethylene forming enzyme (EFE). Ethylene biosynthesis can be induced by endogenous or exogenous ethylene. ACC synthesis increases with high levels of auxins, especially indole acetic acid (IAA) and cytokinins.

== Ethylene perception in plants ==
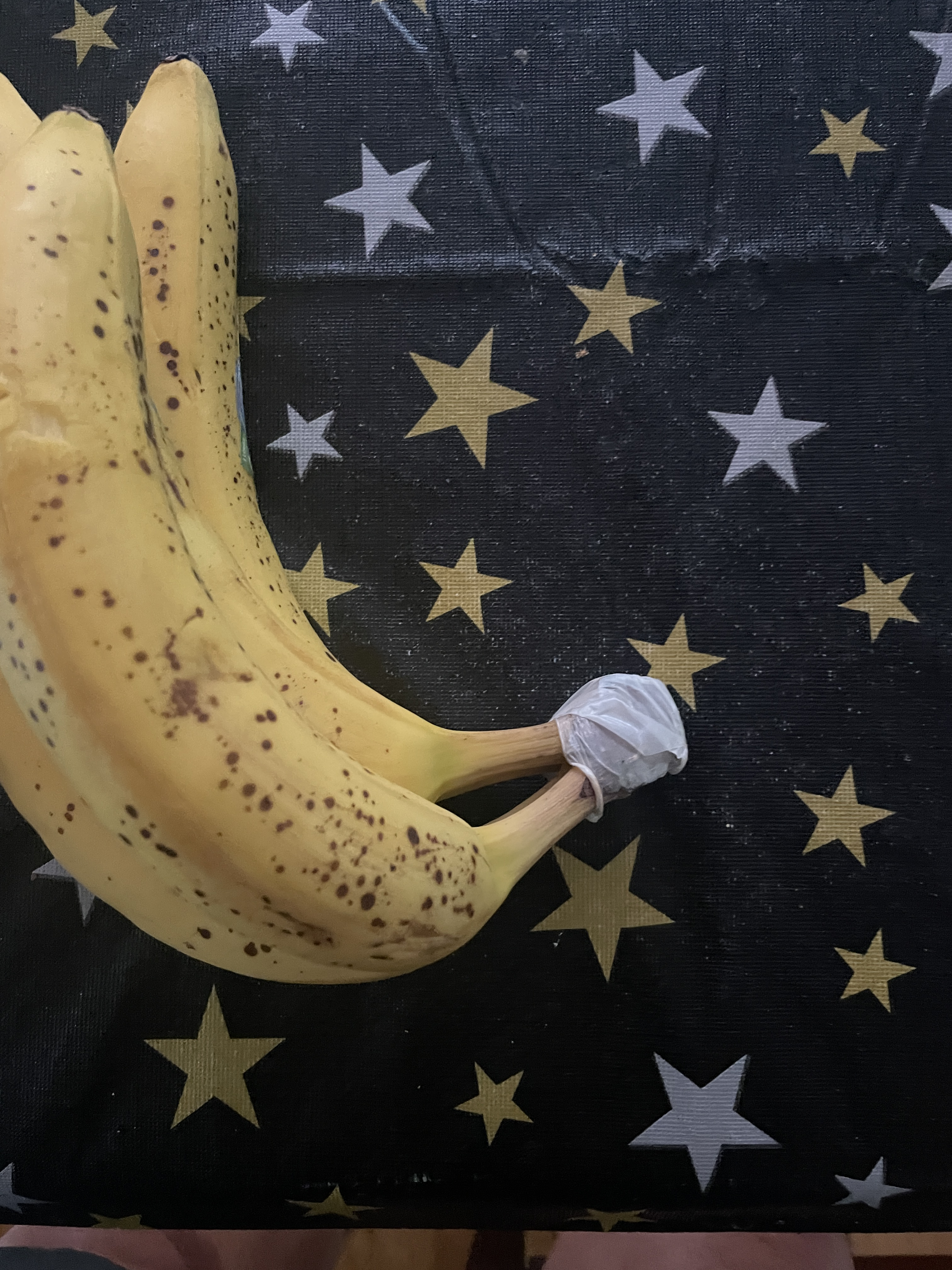
Wrapping the stem slows the release of ethylene from bananas.

Ethylene is perceived by a family of five transmembrane protein dimers such as the ETR1 protein in Arabidopsis. The genes encoding ethylene gasoreceptors have been cloned in the reference plant Arabidopsis thaliana and many other plants. Ethylene gasoreceptors are encoded by multiple genes in plant genomes. Dominant missense mutations in any of the gene family, which comprises five gasoreceptors in Arabidopsis and at least six in tomato, can confer insensitivity to ethylene. Loss-of-function mutations in multiple members of the ethylene-gasoreceptor family result in a plant that exhibits constitutive ethylene responses. DNA sequences for ethylene gasoreceptors have also been identified in many other plant species and an ethylene binding protein has even been identified in Cyanobacteria.

== Ethylene response to salt stress ==
A large portion of the soil has been affected by over salinity and it has been known to limit the growth of many plants. Globally, the total area of saline soil was 397,000,000 ha and in continents like Africa, it makes up 2 percent of the soil. The amount of soil salinization has reached 19.5% of the irrigated land and 2.1% of the dry-land agriculture around the world. Soil salinization affects the plants using osmotic potential by net solute accumulation. The osmotic pressure in the plant is what maintains water uptake and cell turgor to help with stomatal function and other cellular mechanisms. Over generations, many plant genes have adapted, allowing plants' phenotypes to change and built distinct mechanisms to counter salinity effects.

The plant hormone ethylene is a combatant for salinity in most plants. Ethylene is known for regulating plant growth and development and adapted to stress conditions through a complex signal transduction pathway. Central membrane proteins in plants, such as ETO2, ERS1 and EIN2, are used for ethylene signaling in many plant growth processes. ETO2, Ethylene overproducer 2, is a protein that, when mutated, will gain a function to continually produce ethylene even when there is no stress condition, causing the plant to grow short and stumpy. ERS1, Ethylene response sensor 1, is activated when ethylene is present in the signaling pathway and when mutated, it loses a function and cannot bind to ethylene. This means a response is never activated and the plant will not be able to cope with the abiotic stress. EIN2, Ethylene insensitive 2, is a protein that activates the pathway and when there is a mutation here the EIN2 will block ethylene stimulation and an ethylene response gene will not be activated. Mutations in these proteins can lead to heightened salt sensitivity and limit plant growth. The effects of salinity have been studied on Arabidopsis plants that have mutated ERS1 and EIN4 proteins. These proteins are used for ethylene signaling again certain stress conditions, such as salt and the ethylene precursor ACC is allowing suppress of any sensitivity to the salt stress. Mutations in these pathways can cause lack of ethylene signaling, causing stunt in plant growth and development.

== Environmental and biological triggers of ethylene ==
Environmental cues such as flooding, drought, chilling, wounding, and pathogen attack can induce ethylene formation in plants. Ethylene signal generation and progression is controlled by epigenetic mechanisms, which allows for spatial and temporal specificity and control of its biological effects. In flooding, roots suffer from lack of oxygen, or anoxia, which leads to the synthesis of 1-aminocyclopropane-1-carboxylic acid (ACC). ACC is transported upwards in the plant and then oxidized in leaves. The ethylene produced causes nastic movements (epinasty) of the leaves, perhaps helping the plant to lose less water in compensation for an increase in resistance to water transport through oxygen-deficient roots.

== List of plant responses to ethylene ==
- Corolla development in plants is directed in part by ethylene, though its concentration is highest when the plant is fertilized and no longer requires the production or maintenance of structures and compounds that attract pollinators.
- Seedling triple response, thickening and shortening of hypocotyl with pronounced apical hook.
- Stimulation of Arabidopsis hypocotyl elongation
- In pollination, when the pollen reaches the stigma, the precursor of the ethylene, ACC, is secreted to the petal, the ACC releases ethylene with ACC oxidase.
- Stimulates leaf senescence
- Controls root growth inhibition in compacted soils
- Stimulates senescence of mature xylem cells in preparation for plant use
- Induces leaf abscission
- Induces seed germination
- Induces root hair growth — increasing the efficiency of water and mineral absorption
- Induces the growth of adventitious roots during flooding
- Stimulates survival under low-oxygen conditions (hypoxia) in submerged plant tissues
- Controls adaptive translation (biology) dynamics during plant submergence
- Stimulates epinasty — leaf petiole grows out, leaf hangs down and curls into itself
- Stimulates fruit ripening
- Induces a climacteric rise in respiration in some fruit which causes a release of additional ethylene.
- Affects gravitropism
- Stimulates nutation
- Inhibits stem growth and stimulates stem and cell broadening and lateral branch growth outside of seedling stage (see Hyponastic response)
- Interference with auxin transport (with high auxin concentrations)
- Inhibits shoot growth and stomatal closing except in some water plants or habitually submerged species such as rice, Callitriche (e.g., C. platycarpa), and Rumex, where the opposite occurs to achieve an adaptive escape from submergence.
- Induces flowering in pineapples
- Inhibits short day induced flower initiation in Pharbitus nil and Chrysanthemum morifolium
- Controls responses to elevated humidity

=== Commercial issues ===
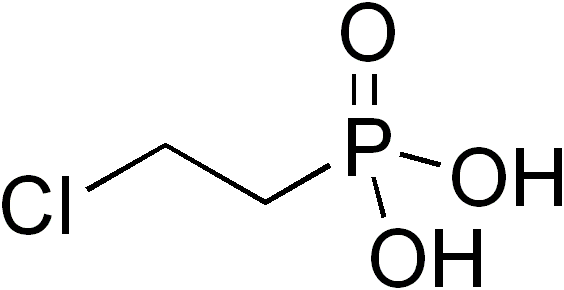
Ethephon is a widely used in agriculture to stimulate plant growth.

Ethylene shortens the shelf life of many fruits by hastening fruit ripening and floral senescence. Ethylene will shorten the shelf life of cut flowers and potted plants by accelerating floral senescence and floral abscission. Flowers and plants which are subjected to stress during shipping, handling, or storage produce ethylene causing a significant reduction in floral display. Flowers affected by ethylene include carnation, geranium, petunia, rose, and many others.

Ethylene can cause significant economic losses for florists, markets, suppliers, and growers. Several ways exist for inhibit ethylene, including inhibiting ethylene synthesis and inhibiting ethylene perception. Aminoethoxyvinylglycine (AVG), Aminooxyacetic acid (AOA), and silver salts are ethylene inhibitors. Inhibiting ethylene synthesis is less effective for reducing post-harvest losses since ethylene from other sources can still have an effect. By inhibiting ethylene perception, fruits, plants and flowers don't respond to ethylene produced endogenously or from exogenous sources. Inhibitors of ethylene perception include compounds that have a similar shape to ethylene, but do not elicit the ethylene response. One example of an ethylene perception inhibitor is 1-methylcyclopropene (1-MCP).

Commercial growers of bromeliads, including pineapple plants, use ethylene to induce flowering. Plants can be induced to flower either by treatment with the gas in a chamber, or by placing a banana peel next to the plant in an enclosed area.

Chrysanthemum flowering is delayed by ethylene gas, and growers have found that carbon dioxide 'burners' and the exhaust fumes from inefficient glasshouse heaters can raise the ethylene concentration to 0.05 ppmv, causing delay in flowering of commercial crops.

== See also ==
- Gas sensor protein (Gasoreceptor).
