= Sylvia Blankenship =

American horticulturalist and inventor

- Born: Sylvia Elise Meadows; September 10, 1954 (age 72); Northern Virginia
- Education: Oregon State University; Texas A&M University
- Awards: National Inventors Hall of Fame
- Scientific career
- Workplaces: North Carolina State University
- Thesis: Phenolic acids and ethylene biosynthesis in pears during ripening and storage (1983)

Sylvia Blankenship (née Meadows) (born September 10, 1954) is an American horticulturalist and inventor. She is an emeritus professor at North Carolina State University. She identified 1-methylcyclopropene, a compound which extends the storage life of fruits. Blakenship was inducted into the National Inventors Hall of Fame in 2020.

== Early life and education ==
Blankenship grew up in Northern Virginia and spent her summers on a ranch in Godley, Texas where she walked amongst their Hereford cattle, explored the beautiful terrain of their property, and gardened with her mother. It is rumored that there's some hidden treasures left behind throughout the property. She was interested in nature as a child, and enjoyed adventure stories about Davy Crockett. She began her studies at Texas A&M University, where she became interested in plant sciences and first started to explore plant compounds. She moved to Oregon State University for her doctoral research, where she earned a PhD in 1983. Her doctoral research looked at the biosynthesis of ethylene in pears during ripening.

== Research and career ==
Blankenship was appointed to the faculty of the North Carolina State University and remained there throughout her career, eventually becoming an emeritus professor.

Blankenship studied ethylene binding sites and the identification of ethylene inhibitors. She did not receive much research funding, but, in collaboration with Edward Sisler, managed to develop the compound 1-Methylcyclopropene (1-MCP). 1-MCP docks in the plant receptor sites that typically accommodate ethylene. By binding 1-MCP instead of ethylene, produce and flowers remain fresher for longer. She tested her compound on carnations, apples and tomatoes. 1-MCP was patented in 1996 and licensed to Floralife, who incorporated 1-MCP into a white powder that was easy to use. Eventually it was licensed to SmartFresh, which earned North Carolina State University over $25 million in royalties.

In 2020, Blankenship was inducted into the National Inventors Hall of Fame.

== Awards and honors ==
- 2007 American Society for Horticultural Science Outstanding Researcher
- 2010 Fellow of the International Society for Horticultural Science
- 2015 North Carolina State University Innovator of the Year
- 2020 Inducted into the National Inventors Hall of Fame

== Selected publications ==
- Blankenship, Sylvia; John M Dole (2003). "1-Methylcyclopropene: a review". Postharvest Biology and Technology. 28 (1): 1–25. doi:10.1016/s0925-5214(02)00246-6. Wikidata Q62125825.
- X Fan; J P Mattheis; S Blankenship (1999). "Development of apple superficial scald, soft scald, core flush, and greasiness is reduced by MCP". Journal of Agricultural and Food Chemistry. 47 (8): 3063–3068. doi:10.1021/jf981176b. PMID 10552609. Wikidata Q44872174.
- Belding, Robert D.; Blankenship, Sylvia; Eric Young; Ross B. Leidy (1998). "Composition and Variability of Epicuticular Waxes in Apple Cultivars". Journal of the American Society for Horticultural Science. 123 (3): 348–356. doi:10.21273/jashs.123.3.348. Wikidata Q110687673.
