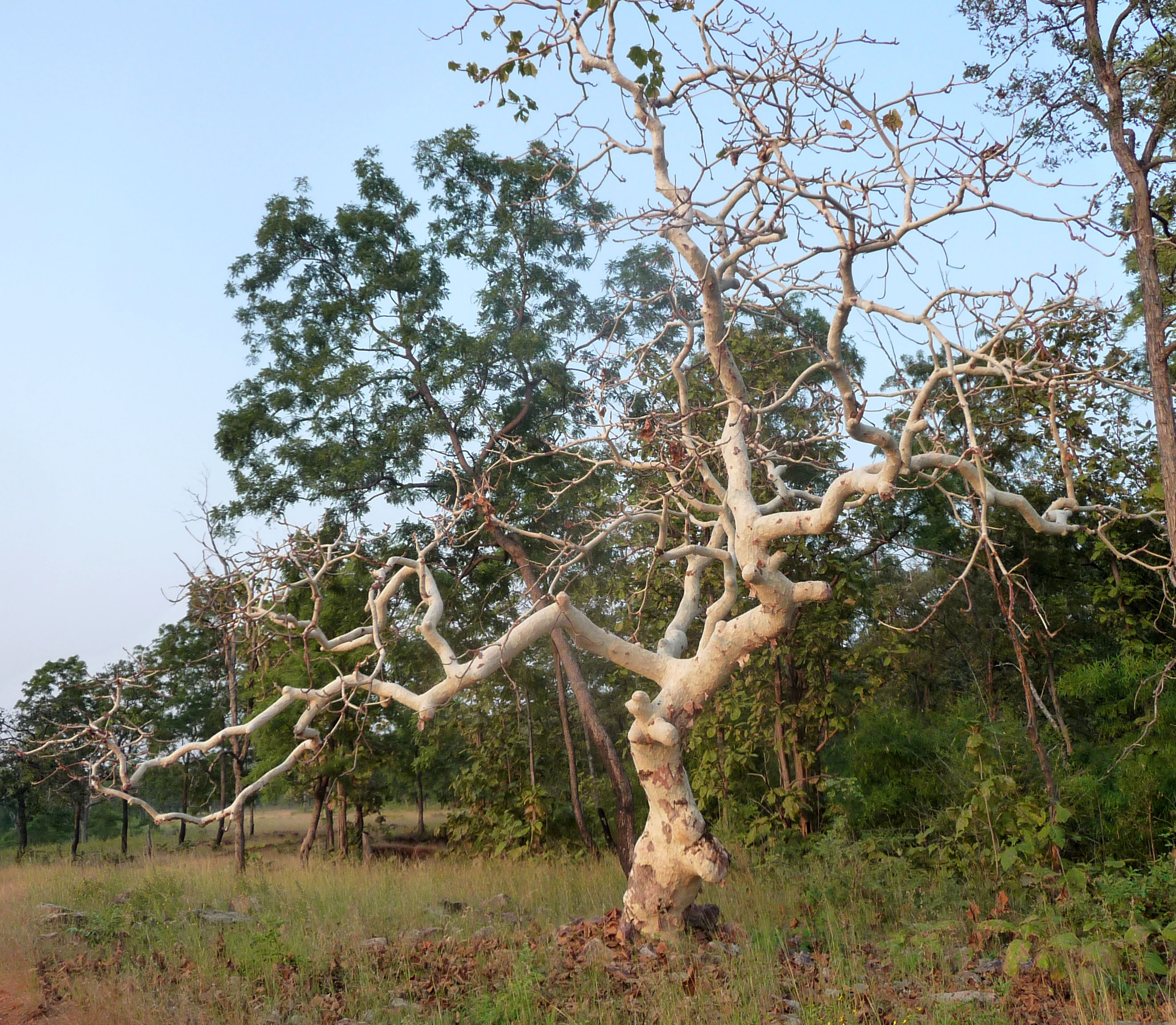

Scientific classification
- Kingdom: Plantae
- Clade: Tracheophytes
- Clade: Angiosperms
- Clade: Eudicots
- Clade: Rosids
- Order: Malvales
- Family: Malvaceae
- Genus: Sterculia
- Species: S. urens

Binomial name
- Sterculia urens Roxb.

Synonyms
- Cavallium urens Schott & Endl.; Clompanus urens Kuntze; Kavalama urens Rafin.

= Sterculia urens =

Species of tree

Sterculia urens is a species of plant in the family Malvaceae. It is native to India and has been introduced into Burma. A small to medium-sized tree with a pale-coloured trunk, it is commonly known as the bhutyā (भुत्या) in Marathi (meaning "ghost tree"), kulu, Indian tragacanth, gum karaya, katira, sterculia gum or kateera gum. The specific name urens refers to the stinging hairs present on the flowers.

== Subspecies ==
Sterculia urens var. thorelii (Pierre) C. Phengklai is an accepted name according to the Catalogue of Life and found in Vietnam, where it is known as bảy thưa Thorel. Synonyms of S.u. thorelii are: Sterculia thorelii Pierre and Clompanus thorellii Kuntze.

== Description ==
The gum karaya is a medium-sized deciduous tree with horizontally-spreading branches, growing to a maximum height of about 15 m (49 ft). The bark is smooth, fibrous and thick, greenish-grey, with the surface layer peeling off in large flakes. The twigs are hairy at first. The leaves are alternate, simple, hairy beneath and have three to five palmate lobes. They are clustered at the tips of the twigs.

Flowers

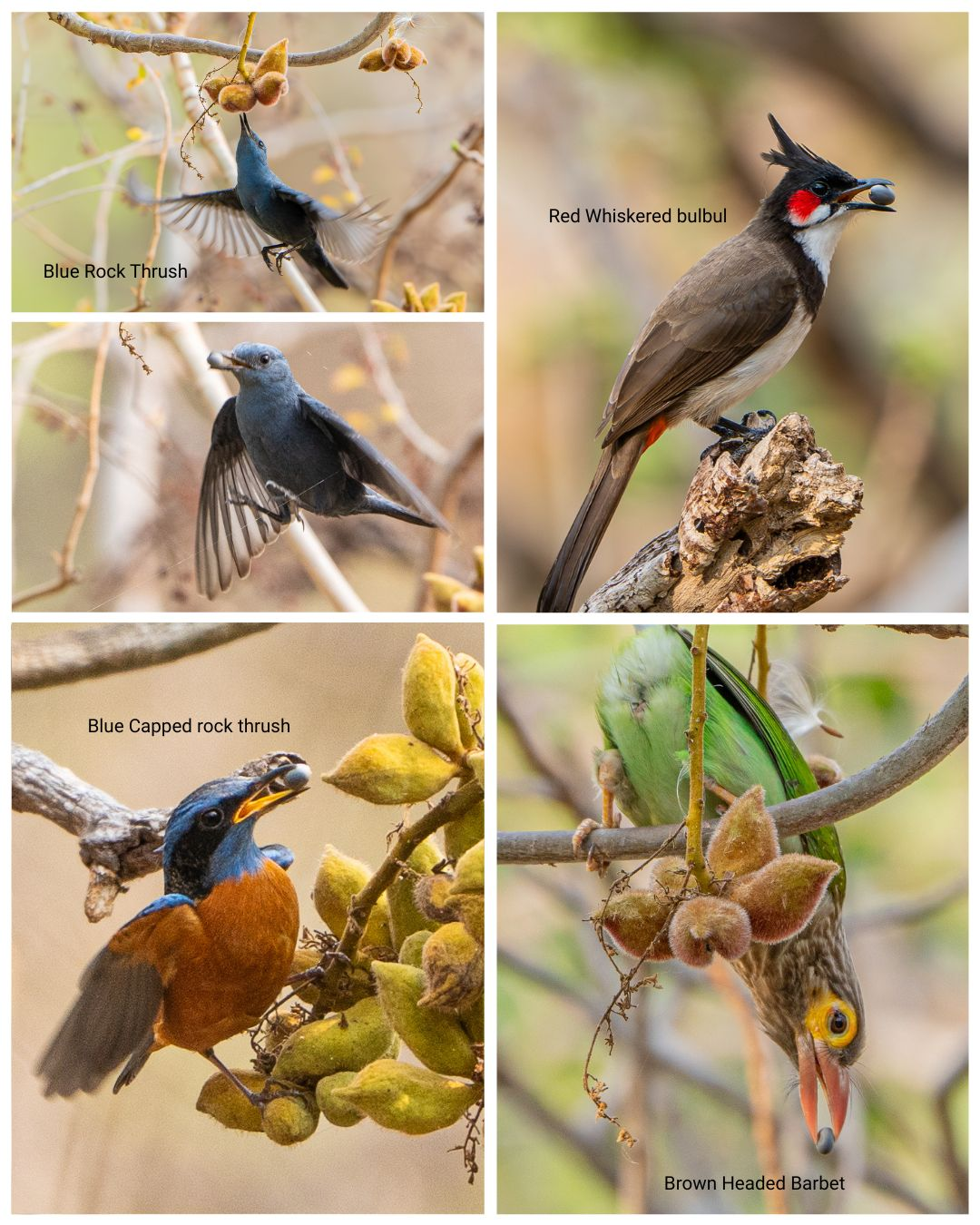
Birds feeding on Sterculia urens, Yercaud

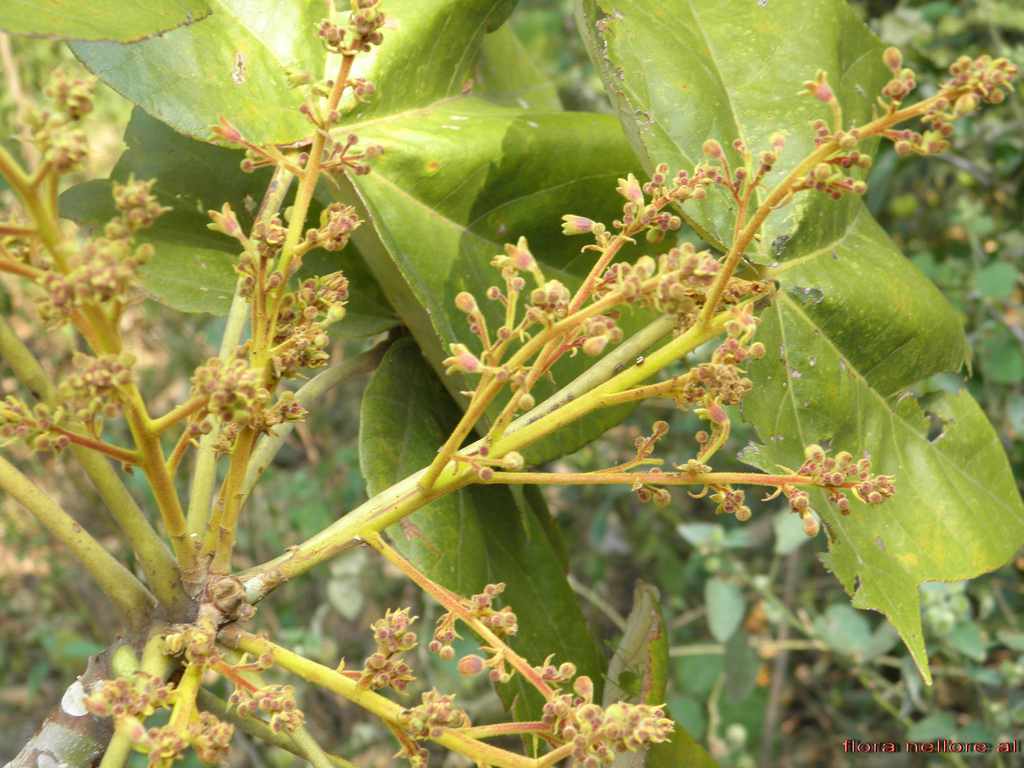
Inflorescence

The flowers are yellowish-green and produced in panicles in the axils of the leaves. They are polygamous (having male, female and bisexual flowers on the same tree) and are clad in sticky or glandular short hairs. The calyx has five lobes and there are no petals. Male flowers have a columnar boss of ten stamens while bisexual flowers have a ring of anthers round the five free, radiating carpels which grow to 75 mm (3 in) when fully developed. They are pinkish and densely covered with red hairs, including stinging hairs. Apis indica is a known pollinator while wind doesn't play any role in pollination.

Fruits

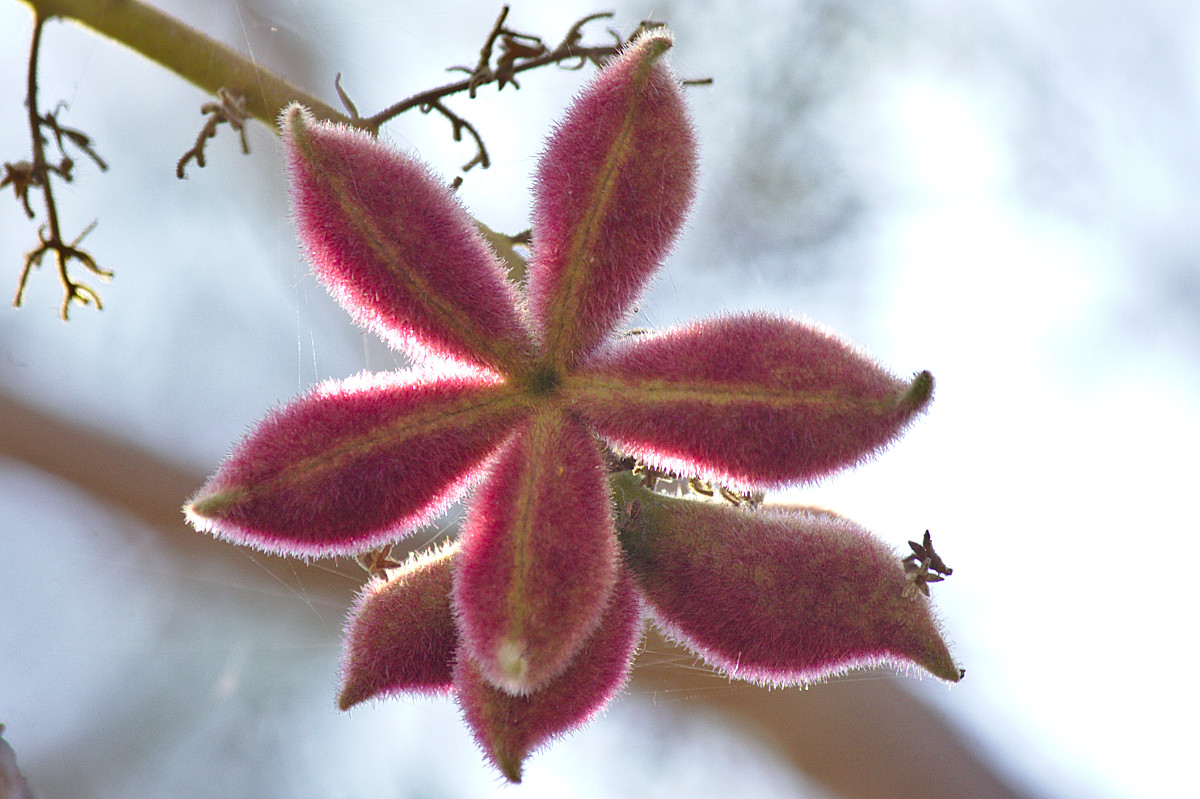
Young fruits of Sterculia urens

They split open when ripe to reveal up to six squarish, brown or black seeds.

== Distribution and habitat ==
The gum karaya is native to the Indian subcontinent, Indo-China and Malesia. It is a common species and grows in deciduous forests, both wet and dry. It is often found on steep, rock-strewn slopes at altitudes between 400 and 800 metres (1,300 and 2,600 ft).

== Gallery ==
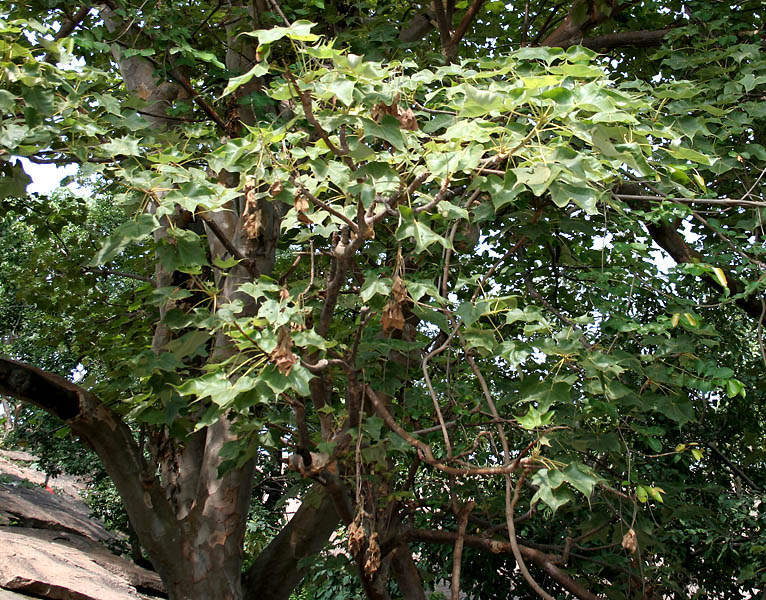
Foliage and fruit

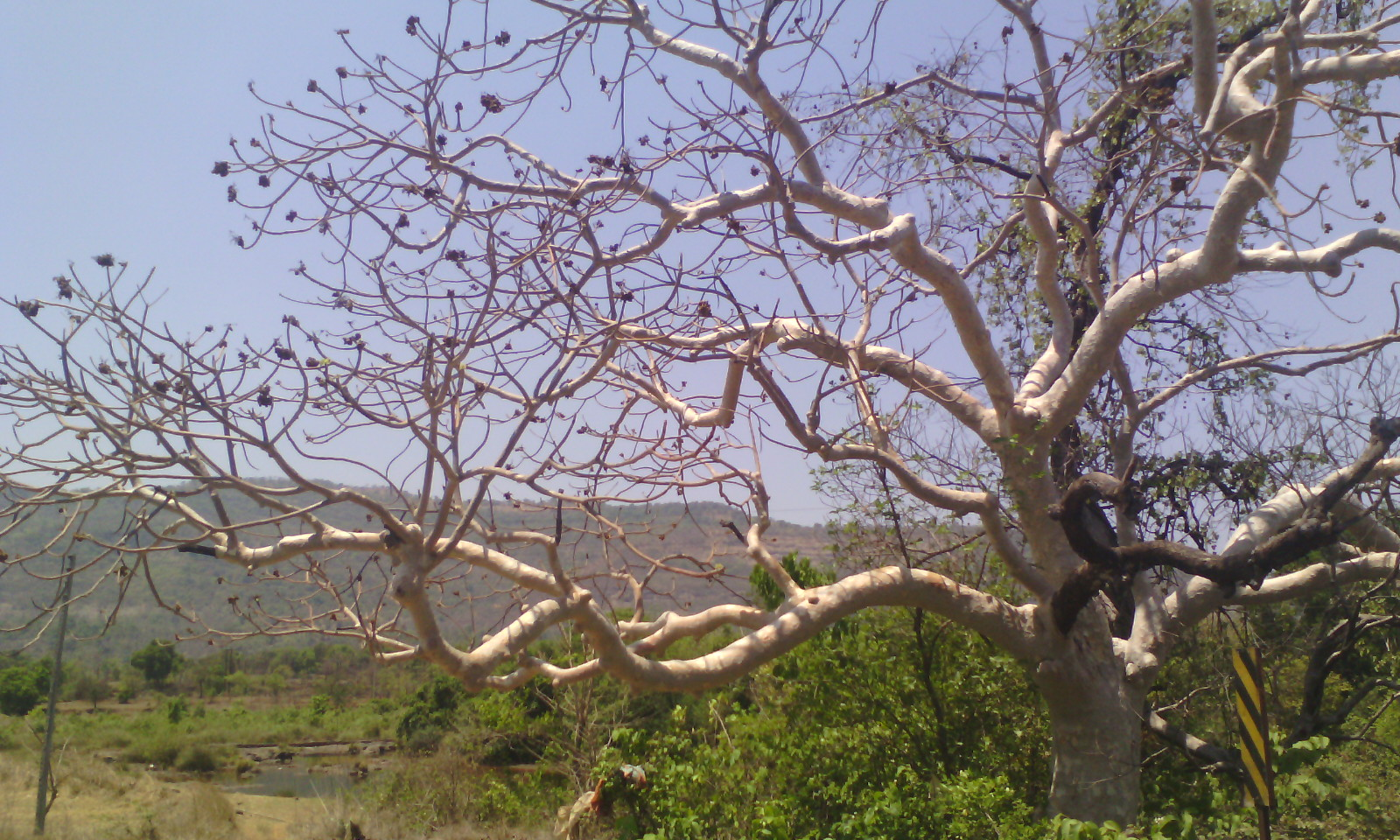
Sterculia urens during the summer in Maharashtra

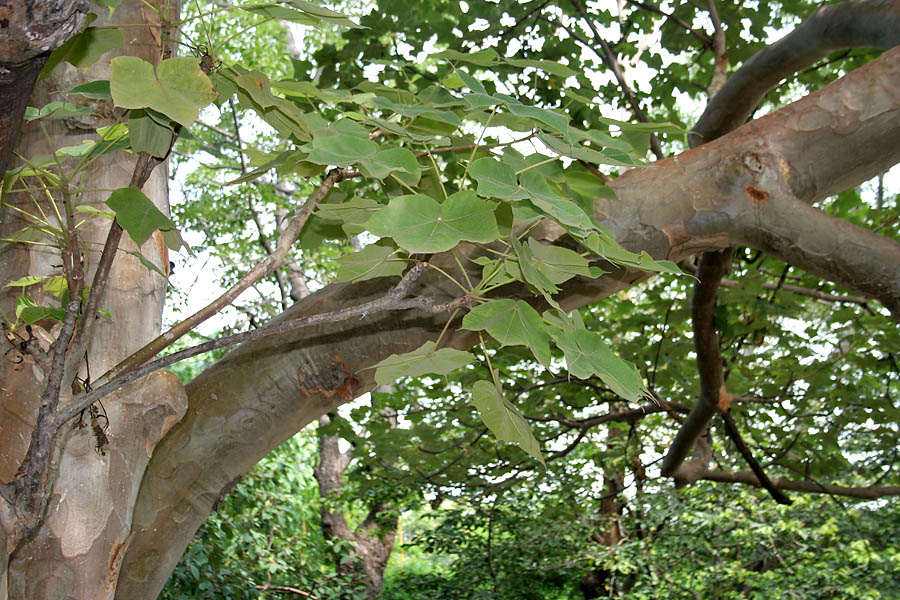

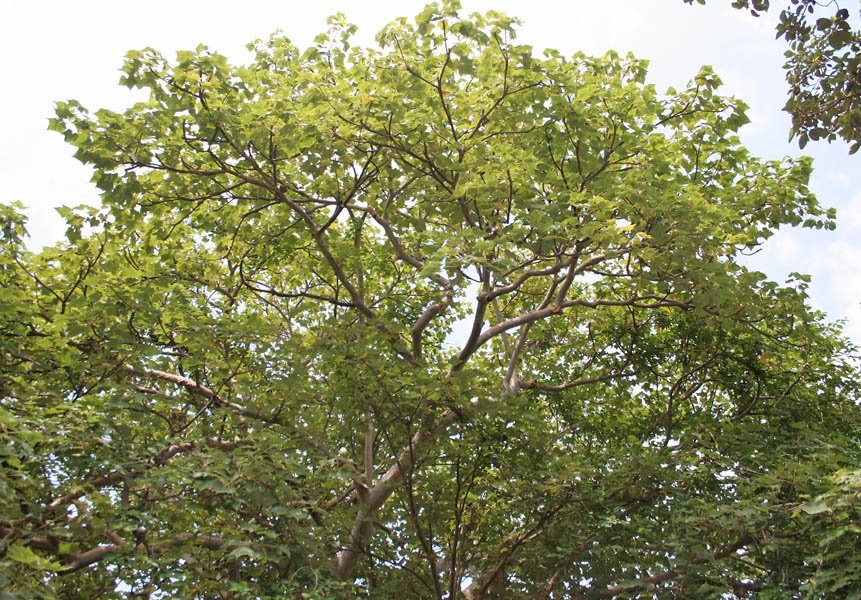

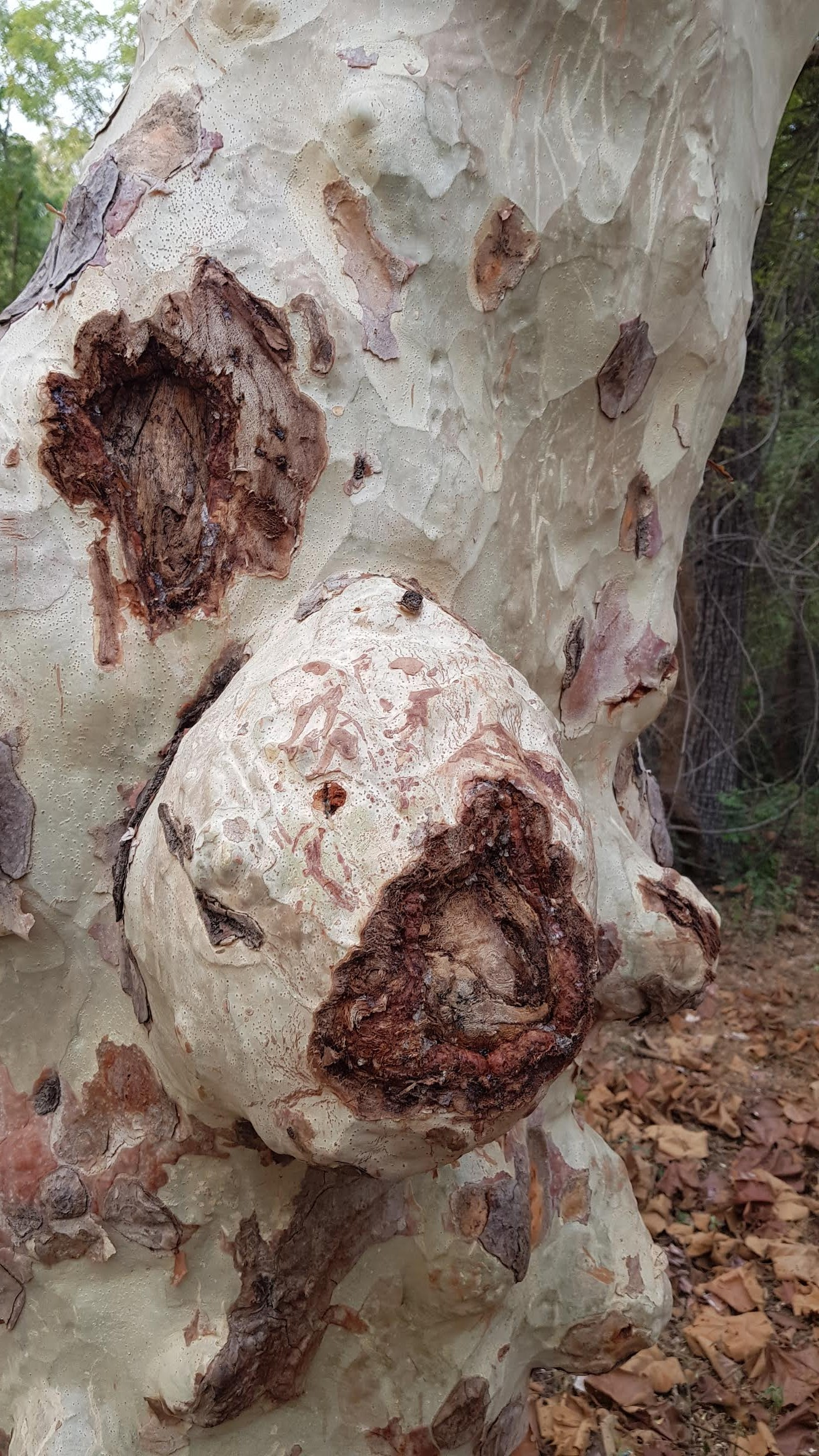
Sterculia urens (Indian Ghost Tree) in Satpura Tiger Reserve, India

== Uses ==
A natural gum known as gum karaya is exuded by the tree when the bark is damaged. This valuable substance is traditionally tapped by cutting or peeling back the bark, or by making deep gashes at the base of the trunk with an axe. Such crude methods of extraction often kill the tree, but it has been found that application of the plant growth regulator ethephon stimulates the production of gum, and when used in carefully controlled amounts, increases gum yield and enhances healing of the wounds.

Karaya gum swells when it absorbs water and is used as a laxative because adds bulk to the contents of the intestine, stimulating the gut to expel waste material. Karaya gum is also reputed to have aphrodisiacal properties, but there is insufficient evidence to support this. Other uses for the gum are as a thickener in cosmetics and medications, and as an adhesive for dentures. In manufacturing, it is added as a binder, emulsifier and stabiliser in the preparation of beverages and foods. The seeds are roasted and eaten.
