= C2H5NO3 =

The molecular formula C_{2}H_{5}NO_{3} (molar mass: 91.07 g/mol, exact mass: 91.0269 u) may refer to:

- Aminooxyacetic acid (AOA or AOAA)
- Ethyl nitrate
