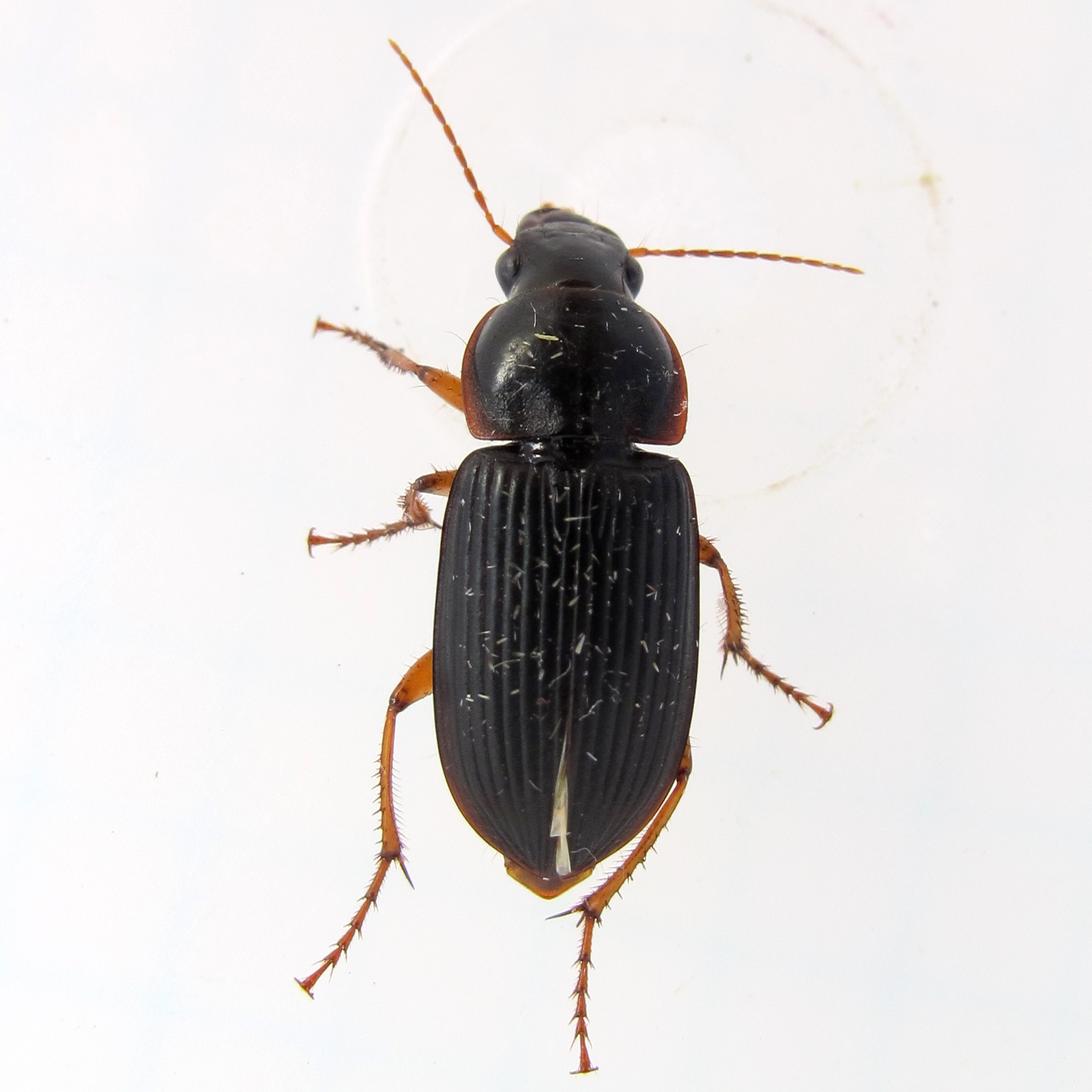

Scientific classification
- Kingdom: Animalia
- Phylum: Arthropoda
- Clade: Pancrustacea
- Class: Insecta
- Order: Coleoptera
- Suborder: Adephaga
- Family: Carabidae
- Genus: Harpalus
- Species: H. pensylvanicus

Binomial name
- Harpalus pensylvanicus (DeGeer, 1774)

Synonyms
- Carabus pensylvanicus DeGeer, 1774; Harpalus inmixtus Casey, 1924; Harpalus longior Kirby, 1837; Harpalus mormonicus Casey, 1914; Pseudoophonus pensylvanicus (DeGeer, 1774)

= Harpalus pensylvanicus =

Species of beetle

Harpalus pensylvanicus, the Pennsylvania ground beetle or Pennsylvania dingy ground beetle, is a species of ground beetle in the subfamily Harpalinae. It is found throughout North America. It was described by Degeer in 1774.

The adults of the species are shiny black on the top, reddish brown underneath, and the elytra have lines. The larvae are black with a reddish head and the body is tapered with two long cerci. The species' food includes the seeds of ragweed and assorted grasses. They are important weed seed predators. They prefer small seeds such as lamb's quarter and waterhemp seeds. They favor high hayfields opposed to low maize fields. The species occasionally damages ripening strawberries which is probably how it gets water. It is attracted to lights.

== Ecology ==
Harpalus pensylvanicus is a significant weed seed predator in agricultural fields. Its consumption of seeds is strongly influenced by water absorption, as the beetle consumes a greater mass of water-absorbed seeds than dry seeds. It can locate these seeds through smell, responding to the high release of carbon dioxide and ethylene that occurs during the initial stages of germination.

== Morphology ==
The beetle has pygidial glands (defensive glands) that contain structures rich in the elastic protein resilin. This composition means that it has a structural adaptation for the rapid or efficient release of defensive secretions.

== Genomics ==
The complete mitochondrial genome of H. pensylvanicus has been characterized, confirming its phylogenetic placement within the Harpalinae subfamily.
