= Post-harvest losses (vegetables) =

Losses in quantity and quality of produce before consumer purchase

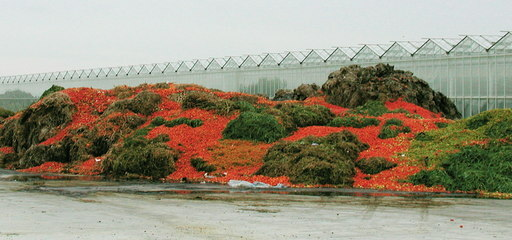
Discarded tomatoes on a compost heap at nurseries in the UK

Post-harvest losses of vegetables and fruits occur at all points in the value chain from production in the field to the food being placed on a plate for consumption. Post-harvest activities include harvesting, handling, storage, processing, packaging, transportation and marketing.

Losses of horticultural produce are a major problem in the post-harvest chain. They can be caused by a wide variety of factors, ranging from growing conditions to handling at retail level. Not only are losses clearly a waste of food, but they also represent a similar waste of human effort, farm inputs, livelihoods, investments, and scarce resources such as water. Post-harvest losses for horticultural produce are, however, difficult to measure. In some cases everything harvested by a farmer may end up being sold to consumers. In others, losses or waste may be considerable. Occasionally, losses may be 100%, for example when there is a price collapse and it would cost the farmer more to harvest and market the produce than to plough it back into the ground. Use of average loss figures is thus often misleading. There can be losses in quality, as measured both by the price obtained and the nutritional value, as well as in quantity.

== On-farm causes of loss ==
There are numerous factors affecting post-harvest losses, from the soil in which the crop is grown to the handling of produce when it reaches the shop. Pre-harvest production practices may seriously affect post-harvest returns. Plants need a continuous supply of water for photosynthesis and transpiration. Damage can be caused by too much rain or irrigation, which can lead to decay; by too little water; and by irregular water supply, which can, for example, lead to growth cracks. Lack of plant food can affect the quality of fresh produce, causing stunted growth or discoloration of leaves, abnormal ripening and a range of other factors. Too much fertilizer can harm the development and post-harvest condition of produce. Good crop husbandry is important for reducing losses. Weeds compete with crops for nutrients and soil moisture. Decaying plant residues in the field are also a major loss factor.

== Causes of loss after harvest ==
Fruits and vegetables are living parts of a plant and contain 65 to 95 percent water. When food and water reserves are exhausted, produce dies and decays. Anything that increases the rate at which a product's food and water reserves are used up increases the likelihood of losses. Increase in normal physiological changes can be caused by high temperature, low atmospheric humidity and physical injury. Such injury often results from careless handling, causing internal bruising, splitting and skin breaks, thus rapidly increasing water loss.

Respiration is a continuing process in a plant and cannot be stopped without damage to the growing plant or harvested produce. It uses stored starch or sugar and stops when reserves of these are exhausted, leading to ageing. Respiration depends on a good air supply. When the air supply is restricted fermentation instead of respiration can occur. Poor ventilation of produce also leads to the accumulation of carbon dioxide. When the concentration of carbon dioxide increases it will quickly ruin produce.

Fresh produce continues to lose water after harvest. Water loss causes shrinkage and loss of weight. The rate at which water is lost varies according to the product. Leafy vegetables lose water quickly because they have a thin skin with many pores. Potatoes, on the other hand, have a thick skin with few pores. But whatever the product, to extend shelf or storage life the rate of water loss must be minimal. The most significant factor is the ratio of the surface area of the fruit or vegetable to its volume. The greater the ratio the more rapid will be the loss of water. The rate of loss is related to the difference between the water vapour pressure inside the produce and in the air. Produce must therefore be kept in a moist atmosphere.

Diseases caused by fungi and bacteria cause losses but virus diseases, common in growing crops, are not a major post-harvest problem. Deep penetration of decay makes infected produce unusable. This is often the result of infection of the produce in the field before harvest. Quality loss occurs when the disease affects only the surface. Skin blemishes may lower the sale price but do not render a fruit or vegetable inedible. Fungal and bacterial diseases are spread by microscopic spores, which are distributed in the air and soil and via decaying plant material. Infection after harvest can occur at any time. It is usually the result of harvesting or handling injuries.

Ripening occurs when a fruit is mature. Ripeness is followed by senescence and breakdown of the fruit. The category “fruit” refers also to products such as aubergine, sweet pepper and tomato. Non-climacteric fruit only ripen while still attached to the parent plant. Their eating quality suffers if they are harvested before fully ripe as their sugar and acid content does not increase further. Examples are citrus, grapes and pineapple. Early harvesting is often carried out for export shipments to minimise loss during transport, but a consequence of this is that the flavour suffers. Climacteric fruit are those that can be harvested when mature but before ripening begins. These include bananas, melons, papayas, and tomatoes. In commercial fruit marketing the rate of ripening is controlled artificially, thus enabling transport and distribution to be carefully planned. Ethylene gas is produced in most plant tissues and is important in starting off the ripening process. It can be used commercially for the ripening of climacteric fruits. However, natural ethylene produced by fruits can lead to in-storage losses. For example, ethylene destroys the green colour of plants. Leafy vegetables will be damaged if stored with ripening fruit. Ethylene production is increased when fruits are injured or decaying and this can cause early ripening of climacteric fruit during transport.

== Damage in the marketing chain ==
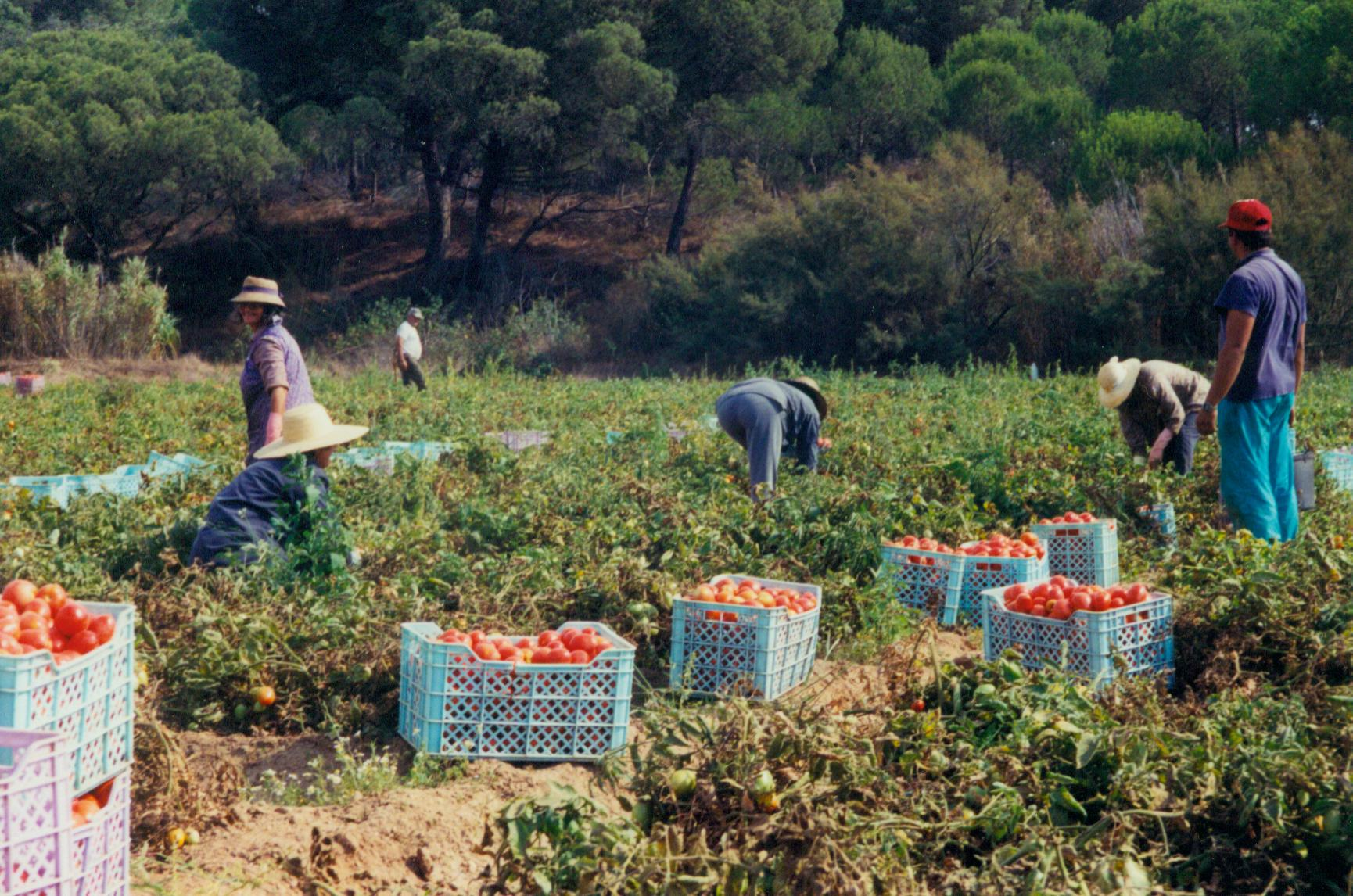
Tomato harvesting in Portugal

Fruits and vegetables are very susceptible to mechanical injury. This can occur at any stage of the marketing chain and can result from poor harvesting practices such as the use of dirty cutting knives; unsuitable containers used at harvest time or during the marketing process, e.g. containers that can be easily squashed or have splintered wood, sharp edges or poor nailing; overpacking or underpacking of containers; and careless handling of containers. Resultant damage can include splitting of fruits, internal bruising, superficial grazing, and crushing of soft produce. Poor handling can thus result in development of entry points for moulds and bacteria, increased water loss, and an increased respiration rate.

Produce can be damaged when exposed to extremes of temperature. Levels of tolerance to low temperatures are importance when cool storage is envisaged. All produce will freeze at temperatures between 0 and -2 degrees Celsius. Although a few commodities are tolerant of slight freezing, bad temperature control in storage can lead to significant losses. Some fruits and vegetables are also susceptible to contaminants introduced after harvest by use of contaminated field boxes; dirty water used for washing produce before packing; decaying, rejected produce lying around packing houses; and unhealthy produce contaminating healthy produce in the same packages.

Losses directly attributed to transport can be high, particularly in developing countries. Damage occurs as a result of careless handling of packed produce during loading and unloading; vibration (shaking) of the vehicle, especially on bad roads; and poor stowage, with packages often squeezed into the vehicle in order to maximise revenue for the transporters. Overheating leads to decay, and increases the rate of water loss. In transport it can result from using closed vehicles with no ventilation; stacking patterns that block the movement of air; and using vehicles that provide no protection from the sun. Breakdowns of vehicles can be a significant cause of losses in some countries, as perishable produce can be left exposed to the sun for a day or more while repairs are carried out.

At the retail marketing stage losses can be significant, particularly in poorer countries. Poor-quality markets often provide little protection for the produce against the elements, leading to rapid produce deterioration. Sorting of produce to separate the saleable from the unsaleable can result in high percentages being discarded, and there can be high weight loss from the trimming of leafy vegetables. Arrival of fresh supplies in a market may lead to some existing, older stock being discarded, or sold at very low prices.

== Avoiding loss ==
Losses can be avoided by following good practices as indicated above. There is also a wide range of post-harvest technologies that can be adopted to improve losses throughout the process of pre-harvest, harvest, cooling, temporary storage, transport, handling, and market distribution. Recommended technologies vary depending on the type of loss experienced. In recent years, researchers have developed digital means to monitor, optimize, and make changes in the management, logistic, and post-harvest supply chain processes to improve quality and reduce food losses. This digital technology, known as "digital twin", involves developing a virtual prototype of fresh produce with its natural characteristics. By coupling input-sensed data with already existing mechanistic models, the actionable output of an entire shipment of fresh produce, including shelf life, thermal injury, microbial spoilage, weight loss, and overall product quality can be identified. Although still in its early stages of application in post-harvest technology, digital twin also helps identify when and where these changes occur in the entire food supply chain. However, all interventions must meet the principle of cost-effectiveness. In theory it should be possible to reduce losses substantially but in practice this may be prohibitively expensive. Especially for small farms, for which it is essential to reduce losses, it is difficult to afford expensive and work-intensive technologies.

== Assessing losses ==
There are no reliable methods for evaluating post-harvest losses of fresh produce although techniques for this have been improving in recent years. Any assessment can only refer to a particular value chain on a particular occasion and, even then, it is difficult to account for quality loss or to differentiate between unavoidable moisture loss and losses due to poor post-harvest handling and other factors described above. Accurate records of losses at various stages of the marketing chain are rarely kept, particularly in tropical countries where losses can be highest, making reliable assessment of the potential cost-effectiveness of interventions at different stages of the chain virtually impossible. The lack of such information may lead to misplaced interventions by governments and donors.

== See also ==
- Food waste
- Post-harvest losses (grains)
