= 1-Methylcyclopropene =

Synthetic plant growth regulator

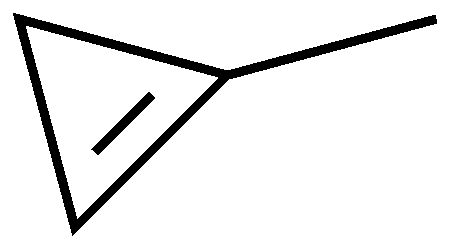
- Skeletal structure of methylcyclopropene

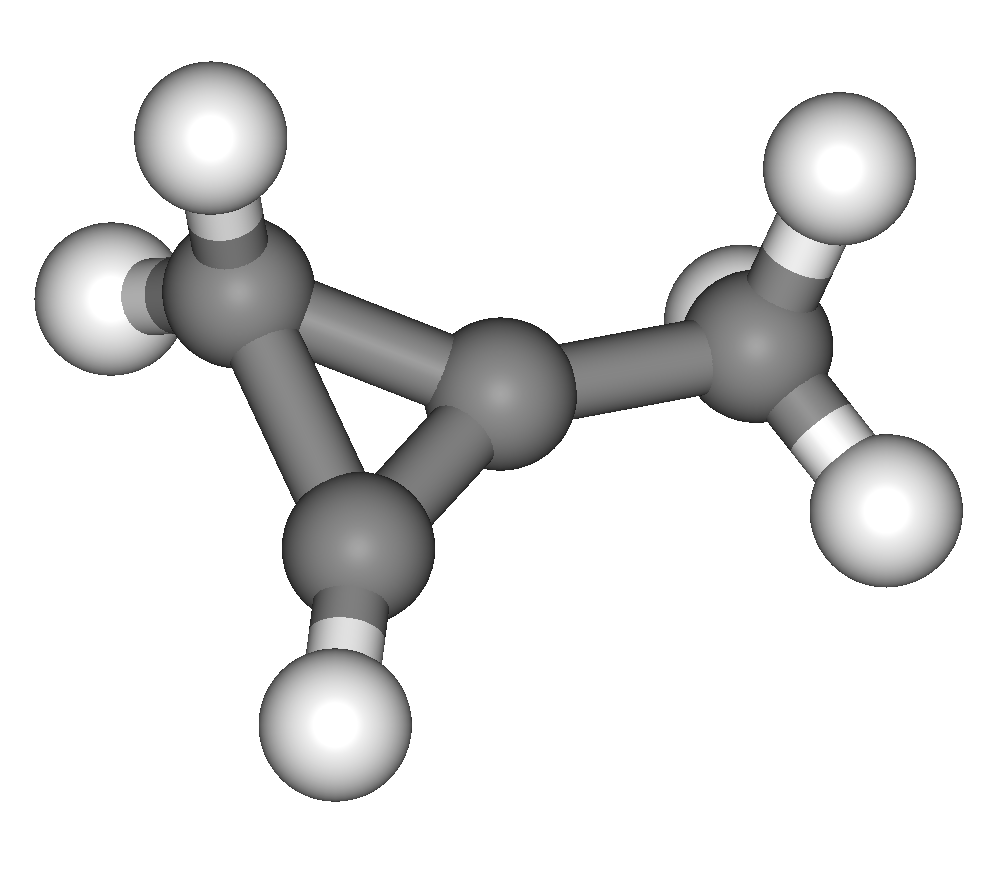
Ball and stick of cyclopropene
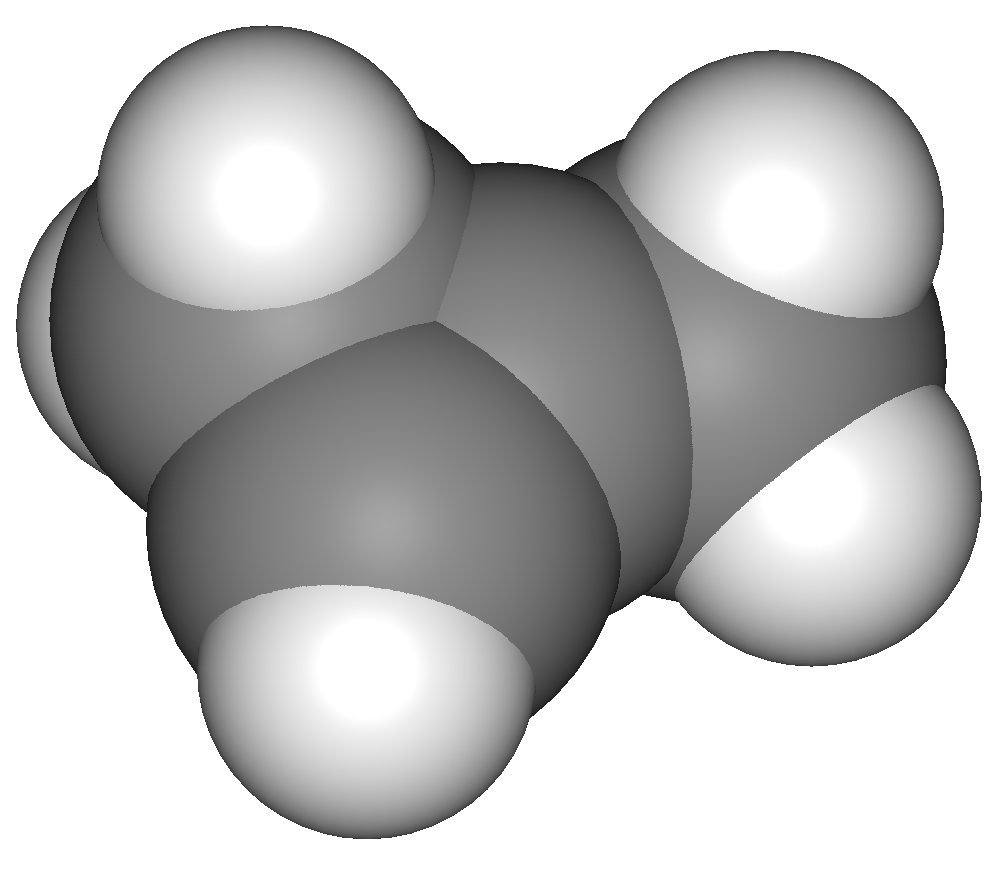
van der Waals model of cyclopropene

Names
- Preferred IUPAC name 1-Methylcycloprop-1-ene

Identifiers
CAS Number	3100-04-7
3D model (JSmol)	Interactive image
Abbreviations	1-MCP
ChEBI	CHEBI:132592
ChemSpider	133162
ECHA InfoCard	100.130.871
PubChem CID	151080
UNII	J6UJO23JGU
CompTox Dashboard (EPA)	DTXSID2035643
- InChI: InChI=1S/C4H6/c1-4-2-3-4/h2H,3H2,1H3 Key: SHDPRTQPPWIEJG-UHFFFAOYSA-N; InChI=1/C4H6/c1-4-2-3-4/h2H,3H2,1H3 Key: SHDPRTQPPWIEJG-UHFFFAOYAJ
- SMILES: C\1=C(/C)C/1

Properties
Chemical formula	C_{4}H_{6}
Molar mass	54.092 g·mol^{−1}
Boiling point	12 °C (54 °F; 285 K)(approx)
- Except where otherwise noted, data are given for materials in their standard state (at 25 °C [77 °F], 100 kPa). Infobox references

The compound 1-methylcyclopropene, also known as 1-MCP, is a cyclopropene derivative used as a synthetic plant growth regulator. It is structurally related to the natural plant hormone ethylene and it is used commercially to slow down the ripening of fruit and to help maintain the freshness of cut flowers.

== Synthesis ==
The compound 1-methylcyclopropene is synthesized by the reaction of methallyl chloride and phenyllithium, which functions as a base:

Methallyl chloride

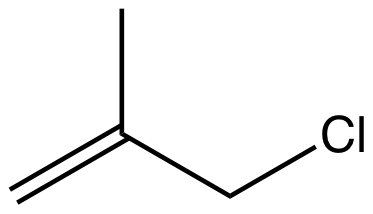

Phenyl lithium

(base)

LiCl + PhH

1-Methylcyclopropene

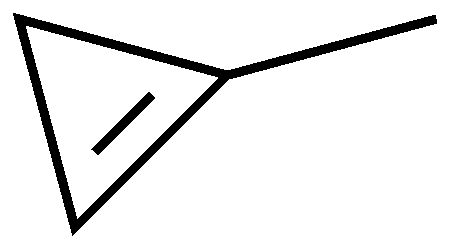

The phenyllithium should be free of lithium halides. The corresponding reaction of allyl chloride and phenyllithium main affords cyclopropylbenzene.

== Mechanism of action ==
Ethylene is a gas acting at trace levels (typically between a few tenths and a few thousands ppm in the gas atmosphere) throughout the life of a plant by stimulating or regulating various processes such as the ripening of climacteric fruit, the opening of flowers (dehiscence process), and the shedding of leaves (abscission process). The mechanism of action of 1-MCP involves its tightly binding to the ethylene receptor in plants, thereby blocking the effects of ethylene (competitive inhibitor).

== Commercial use ==
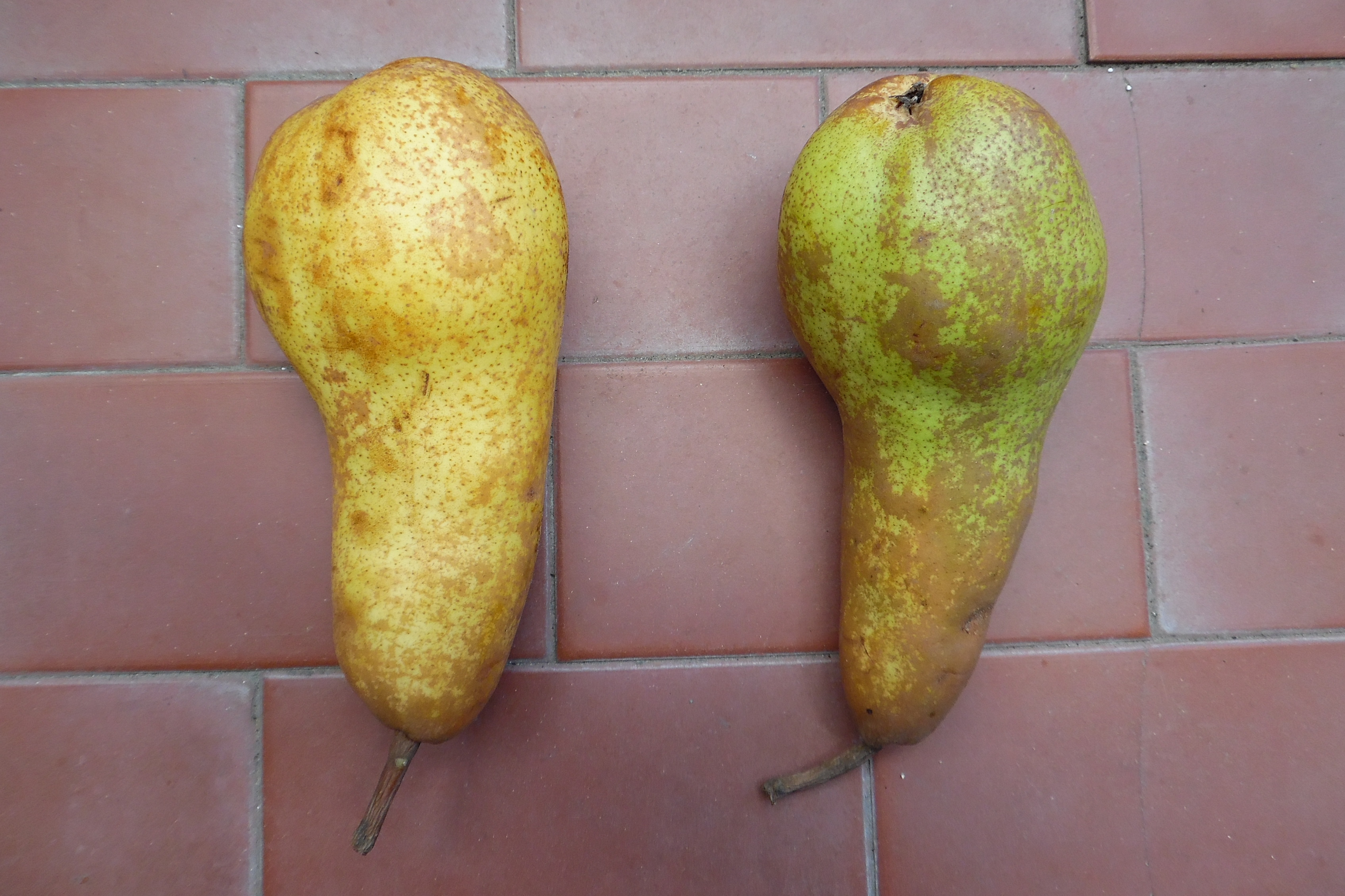
Two same-aged Abate Fetel pears: unlike the left one, the right one was treated with 1-MCP after the harvest

The compound 1-MCP is used commercially to maintain the freshness of ornamental plants and flowers and preventing the ripening of fruits. It is used in enclosed sites, such as coolers, truck trailers, greenhouses, storage facilities, and shipping containers.

Under the brand name EthylBloc, 1-MCP was approved in 1999 by the U.S. Environmental Protection Agency for use on ornamental crops. For cut flowers, potted flowers, and bedding, nursery and foliage plants, 1-MCP prevents or delays wilting, leaf yellowing, opening, and death.

Under the brand name SmartFresh, 1-MCP is used in the agriculture industry by growers, packers, and shippers to prevent or delay the natural ripening process. The use of 1-MCP in agricultural products including apples, kiwifruit, tomatoes, bananas, plums, persimmons, avocados, and melons has been approved and accepted for use in more than 34 countries including the European Union and the United States. Although benefiting from fresher produce and lower cost, the consumer however may be purchasing fruit that is older than expected.

The compound 1-MCP is also being developed as a crop protection technique. By spraying 1-MCP on growing field crops during times of stress, the crops may be protected from moderate heat and drought conditions.

== See also ==
- Ethylene as a plant hormone
- Methylenecyclopropane, an isomer
