= SmartFresh =

Gas inhibiting the ethylene ripening process for prolonging fruits conservation

SmartFresh (SmartFresh Quality System) is a brand of a synthetic produce quality enhancer containing 1-methylcyclopropene (1-MCP). It is marketed by AgroFresh Solutions, Inc., a publicly held (NASDAQ:AGFS) U.S. company with global operations. SmartFresh technology halts the fruits and vegetables' natural ripening process to prolong freshness.

== Function ==
1-MCP blocks the effects of both endogenous and exogenous ethylene through preferential attachment to the ethylene receptor. It is applied in storage facilities and transit containers to slow down the ripening process and the production of ethylene in fruit. Ethylene agent is not useful postharvest for fruit that is already ripe. The method of prolonging produce lifetime in this way was approved by the EU in 2005, and can be combined with standard controlled atmosphere technology.

== Consumer concerns ==
The use of 1-MCP to prevent fruit ripening came under scrutiny by the press during late 2005, when it was shown that the method is occasionally used to inhibit ripening of fruit by as much as a year, causing consumers to purchase year-old fruit without being aware of it. Fruits which have been treated with 1-MCP do not trigger any labelling regulations, and are allowed for use with certified organic foods, and are therefore non-distinguishable from non-treated products. In the United States the National Organic Program does not allow the use of 1-MCP on organic produce. The only test devised by the United States Environmental Protection Agency, radioisolated analytical method, is too expensive, though it can measure residues on fruit up to 90 days post treatment. Its convenience of application makes it easily accessible for farmers and producers. Studies have shown there is no residue left on the fruit post processing. Identified as a synthetic, 1-MCP is not approved for use on U.S. foods labeled “organic” by the United States Department of Agriculture. 1-MCP has regulatory approval for use on produce in more than 30 countries, including the U.S. and European Union.

By 2006, retailers were split on whether this quality enhancer should be used. In a True Food Network publication of Greenpeace, Apple & Pear Australia business manager Tony Russell claimed that prolonged lifetime of produce is necessary to deliver edible fruit during the whole year, and that these fruits are still healthy. He was countered by Sydney Postharvest Laboratory director Dr Stephen Morris in that Vitamin C and antioxidant levels may still decline, a concern also shared by others in the industry.

SmartFresh is perceived by Susan Kegley, a senior scientist at the San Francisco-based Pesticide Action Network North America, as being “likely to be very low-risk to consumers”. Other scientists see 1-MCP as "most likely harmless to humans".

== See also ==
- Post-harvest losses (fruit and vegetables)
