= Aminocyclopropanecarboxylate oxidase =

Identifiers
- EC no.: 1.14.17.4

Databases
- IntEnz: IntEnz view
- BRENDA: BRENDA entry
- ExPASy: NiceZyme view
- KEGG: KEGG entry
- MetaCyc: metabolic pathway
- PRIAM: profile
- PDB structures: RCSB PDB PDBe PDBsum
Search
- PMC: articles
- PubMed: articles
- NCBI: proteins

In enzymology, an aminocyclopropanecarboxylate oxidase (EC 1.14.17.4) is an enzyme that catalyzes the chemical reaction

1-aminocyclopropane-1-carboxylate + ascorbate + O_{2} $\rightleftharpoons$ ethylene + cyanide + dehydroascorbate + CO_{2} + 2 H_{2}O

The 3 substrates of this enzyme are 1-aminocyclopropane-1-carboxylate, ascorbate, and O_{2}, whereas its 5 products are ethylene, cyanide, dehydroascorbate, CO_{2}, and H_{2}O.

This enzyme belongs to the family of oxidoreductases, specifically those acting on paired donors, with O2 as oxidant and incorporation or reduction of oxygen. The oxygen incorporated need not be derived from O2 with reduced ascorbate as one donor, and incorporation of one atom of oxygen into the other donor. The systematic name of this enzyme class is 1-aminocyclopropane-1-carboxylate oxygenase (ethylene-forming). Other names in common use include ACC oxidase, and ethylene-forming enzyme.

== Structural studies ==
As of late 2007, two structures have been solved for this class of enzymes, with PDB accession codes 1W9Y and 1WA6.

== Reaction Mechanism ==
Mechanistic and structural studies support binding of ACC and oxygen to an iron center located in the active site of ACC oxidase. The ring-opening of bound ACC is believed to result in the elimination of ethylene together with an unstable intermediate, cyanoformate ion, which then decomposes to cyanide ion and carbon dioxide. Cyanide ion is a known deactivating agent for iron-containing enzymes, but the cyanoformate ion intermediate is believed to play a vital role to carry potentially toxic cyanide away from the active site of ACC oxidase. Cyanoformate was recently identified in condensed media as a tetraphenylphosphonium salt with a weak carbon-carbon bond.
