= Ethephon =

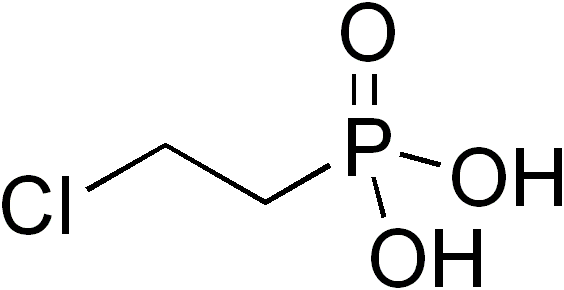

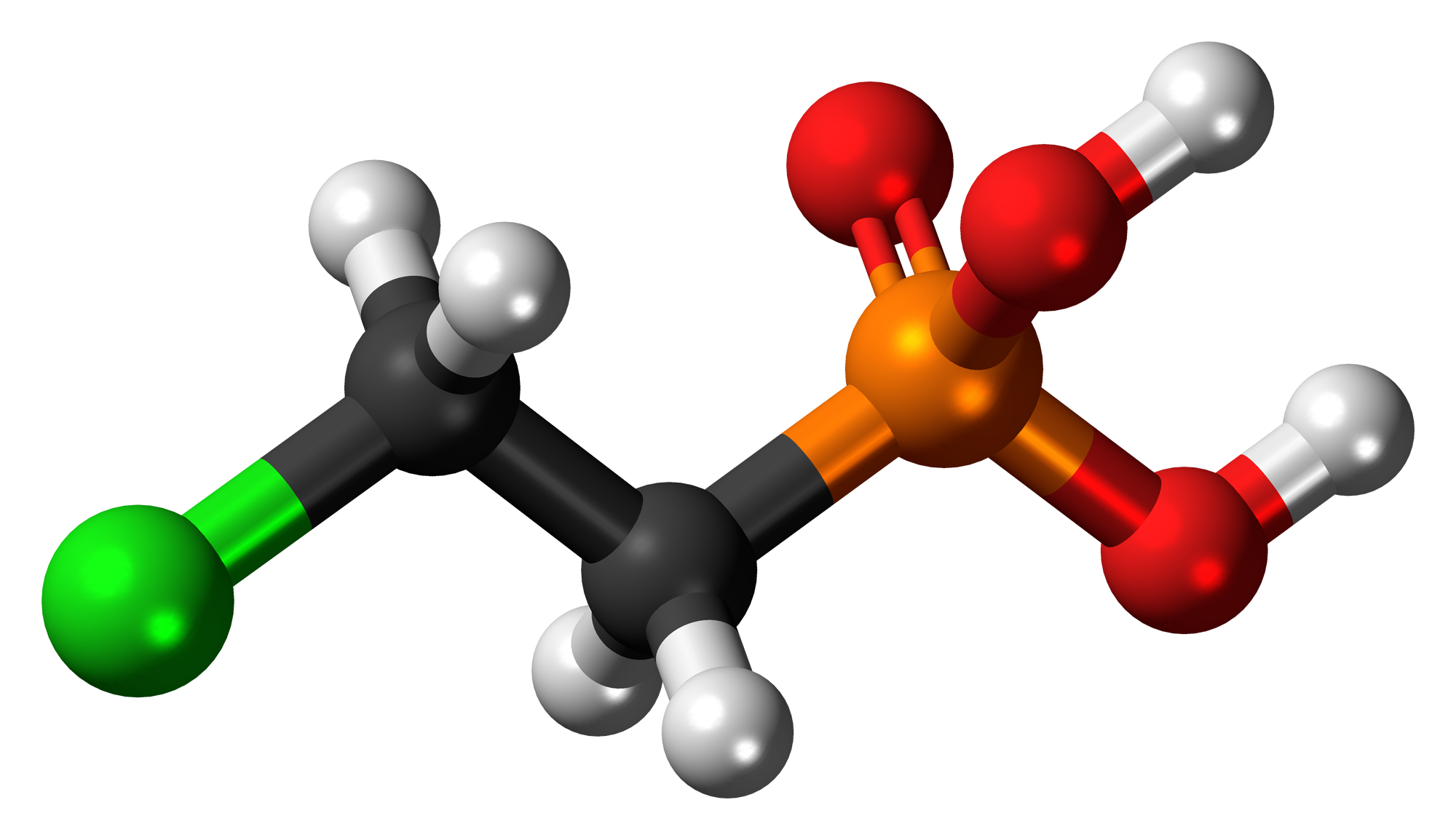

Names
- Preferred IUPAC name (2-Chloroethyl)phosphonic acid
- Other names Bromeflor; Arvest; Ethrel

Identifiers
CAS Number	16672-87-0
3D model (JSmol)	Interactive image
ChEBI	CHEBI:52741
ChemSpider	26031
ECHA InfoCard	100.037.002
KEGG	C18399
PubChem CID	27982
UNII	XU5R5VQ87S
CompTox Dashboard (EPA)	DTXSID7024085
- InChI: InChI=1S/C2H6ClO3P/c3-1-2-7(4,5)6/h1-2H2,(H2,4,5,6) Key: UDPGUMQDCGORJQ-UHFFFAOYSA-N; InChI=1/C2H6ClO3P/c3-1-2-7(4,5)6/h1-2H2,(H2,4,5,6) Key: UDPGUMQDCGORJQ-UHFFFAOYAQ
- SMILES: ClCCP(=O)(O)O

Properties
Chemical formula	C_{2}H_{6}ClO_{3}P
Molar mass	144.49 g·mol^{−1}
Appearance	white solid
Density	1.409 g/cm^{3}
Melting point	74 °C (165 °F; 347 K)
Solubility in water	123.9 g/100 mL (23 °C)

Hazards
- Occupational safety and health (OHS/OSH)
Main hazards	Corrosive
- Except where otherwise noted, data are given for materials in their standard state (at 25 °C [77 °F], 100 kPa). verify (what is ?) Infobox references

Ethephon is an organophosphorus compound with the formula (HO)_{2}P(O)CH_{2}CH_{2}Cl. It is a colorless solid that is used as plant growth regulator.

== Mechanism of action ==
Upon metabolism by the plant, it is converted into ethylene, a potent regulator of plant growth and ripeness. When applied in a plant that is in a vegetative stage, ethylene usually acts by hindering vegetative growth and inducing the start of the flowering stage. If applied in a later stage, it can accelerate the ripening of some fruits.

It is also a butyrylcholinesterase inhibitor.

== Uses in various crops ==
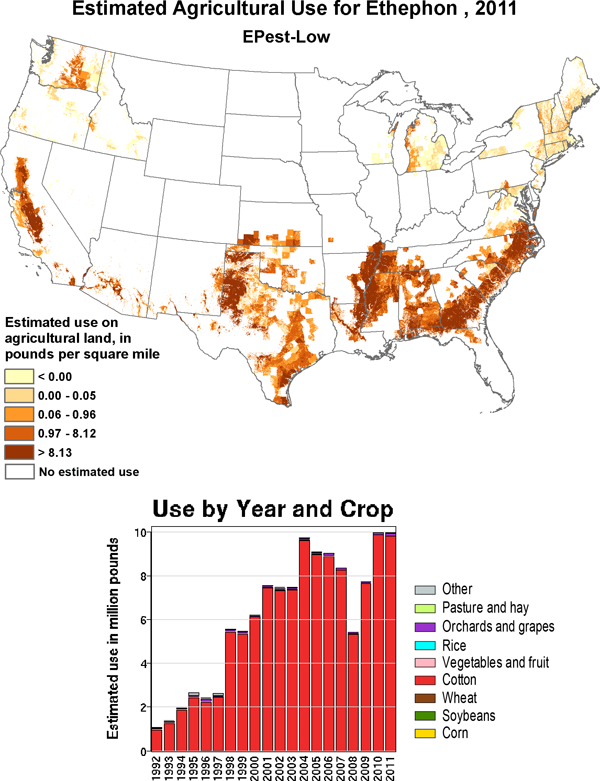
Ethephon use in the US in 2011; it is almost solely used on cotton crops.

=== Ripening ===
Ethephon is often used on wheat, coffee, tobacco, cotton, rice, sapote, and sugar cane in order to help the plant's fruit reach ripeness more quickly.

Cotton is the most important single crop use for ethephon. It initiates fruiting over a period of several weeks, promotes early concentrated boll opening, and enhances defoliation to facilitate and improve the efficiency of scheduled harvesting. Harvested cotton quality is improved.

Ethephon is also widely used by pineapple growers to initiate the fruit's reproductive development (forcing). Ethephon is also sprayed on mature-green pineapple fruits to degreen them to meet produce marketing requirements. There can be some detrimental effect on fruit quality.

=== Sexual effects ===
It is sometimes used by cannabis growers to induce flowering, abort seed formation, increase the quality of the resins, induce the appearance of female flowers in male plants, and to suppress the development of male flowers in monoecious plants.

== Safety ==
The toxicity of ethephon is very low, and any ethephon used on the plant is converted very quickly to ethylene.

The use of this chemical is allowed in the European Union.
