= 1-Aminocyclopropane-1-carboxylate synthase =

Class of enzymes

1-aminocyclopropane-1-carboxylate synthase
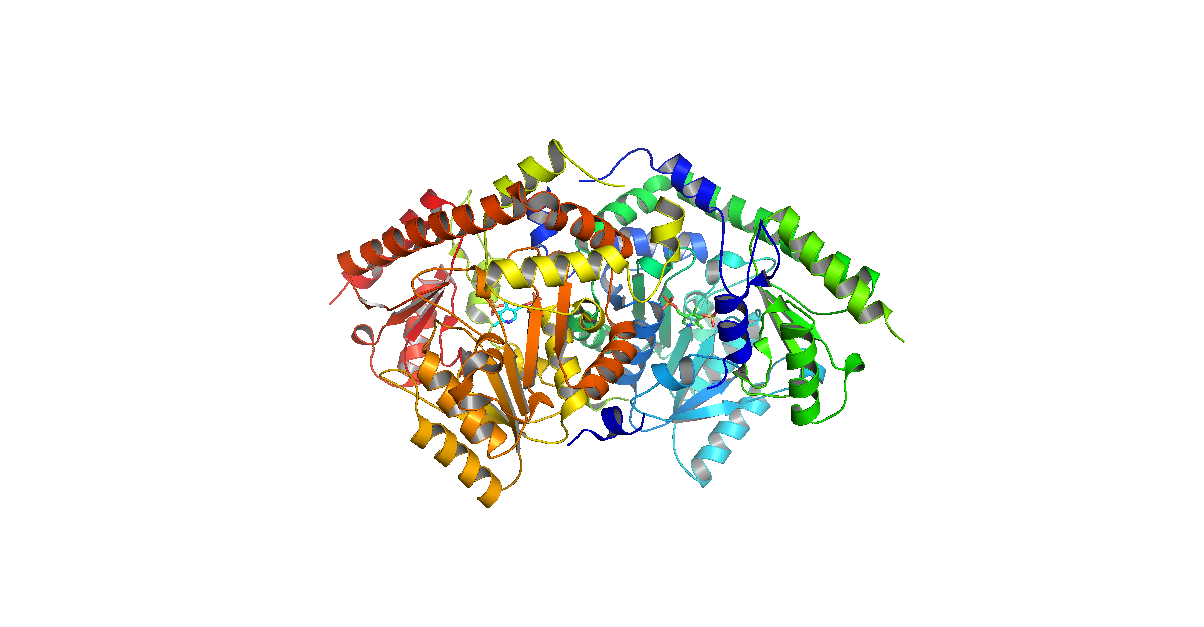
- Structure of ACC Synthase

Identifiers
- EC no.: 4.4.1.14
- CAS no.: 72506-68-4

Databases
- BRENDA: enzyme data
- ExPASy: NiceZyme view
- KEGG: enzyme entry
- MetaCyc: metabolic pathway
- Rhea: reactions
- PDB structures: RCSB PDB PDBe PDBsum
- Gene Ontology: AmiGO / QuickGO
Search
- PMC: articles
- PubMed: articles
- NCBI: proteins

The enzyme aminocyclopropane-1-carboxylic acid synthase (ACC synthase, ACS) (EC 4.4.1.14) catalyzes the synthesis of 1-Aminocyclopropane-1-carboxylic acid (ACC), a precursor for ethylene, from S-Adenosyl methionine (AdoMet, SAM), an intermediate in the Yang cycle and activated methyl cycle and a useful molecule for methyl transfer:

S-adenosyl-L-methionine = 1-aminocyclopropane-1-carboxylate + S-methyl-5′-thioadenosine

Like other PLP dependent enzymes, it catalyzes the reaction through a quinonoid zwitterion intermediate and uses cofactor pyridoxal phosphate (PLP, the active form of vitamin B6) for stabilization.

This enzyme belongs to the family of lyases, specifically carbon-sulfur lyases. The systematic name of this enzyme class is S-adenosyl-L-methionine S-methyl-5′-thioadenosine-lyase (1-aminocyclopropane-1-carboxylate-forming). Other names in common use include 1-aminocyclopropanecarboxylate synthase, 1-aminocyclopropane-1-carboxylic acid synthase, 1-aminocyclopropane-1-carboxylate synthetase, aminocyclopropanecarboxylic acid synthase, aminocyclopropanecarboxylate synthase, ACC synthase, and S-adenosyl-L-methionine methylthioadenosine-lyase. This enzyme participates in propanoate metabolism. It employs one cofactor, pyridoxal phosphate.

== Enzyme mechanism ==
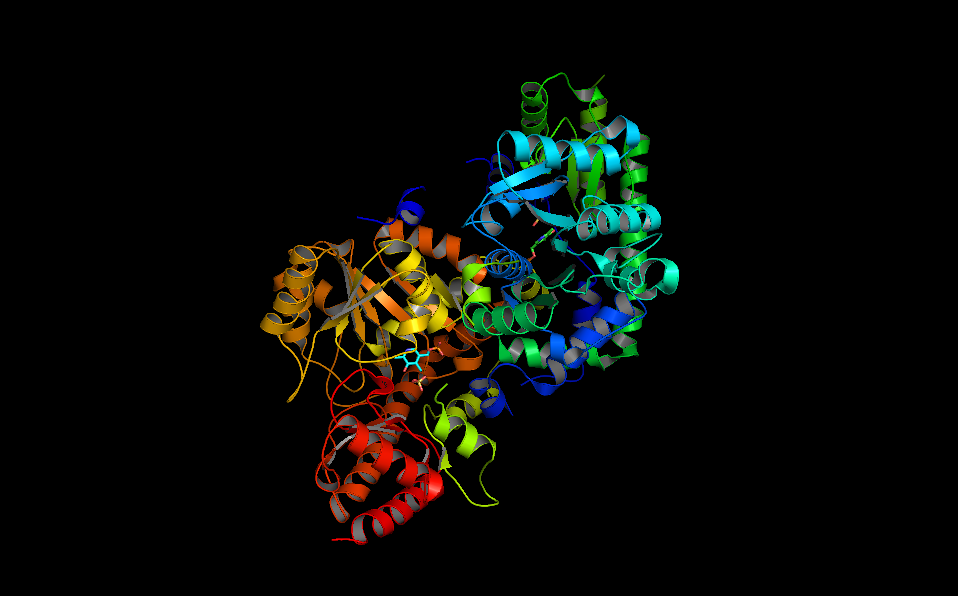
ACC Synthase Complex with PLP

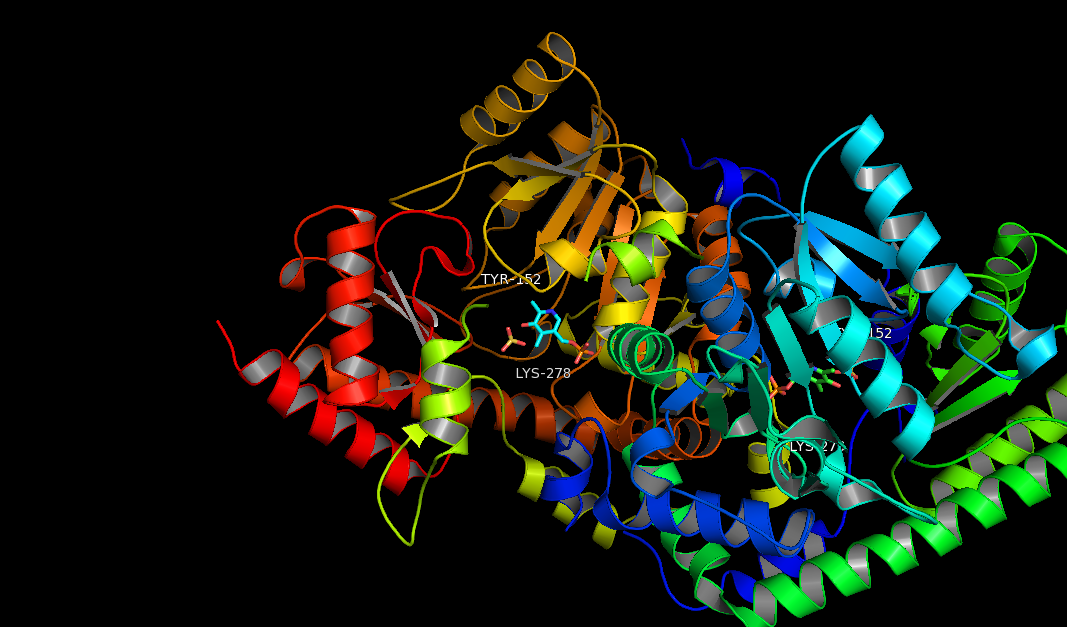
ACC Synthase Complex with PLP: Catalytic Domain

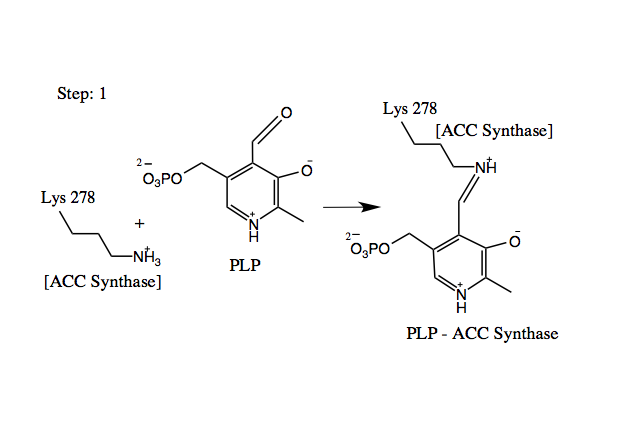
Formation of the ACS-PLP Schiff Base.

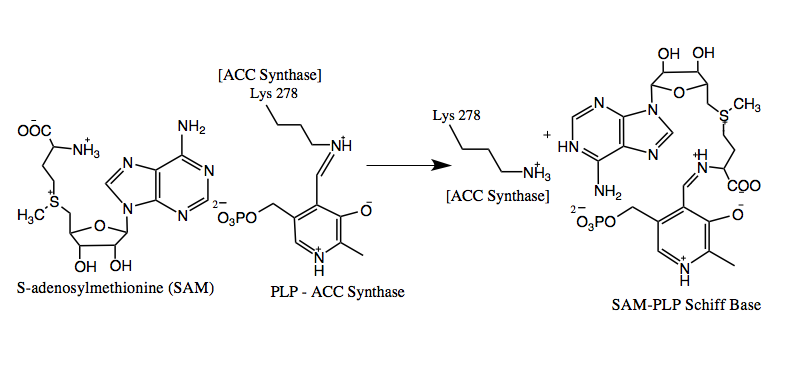
Lys to SAM Imine Exchange.

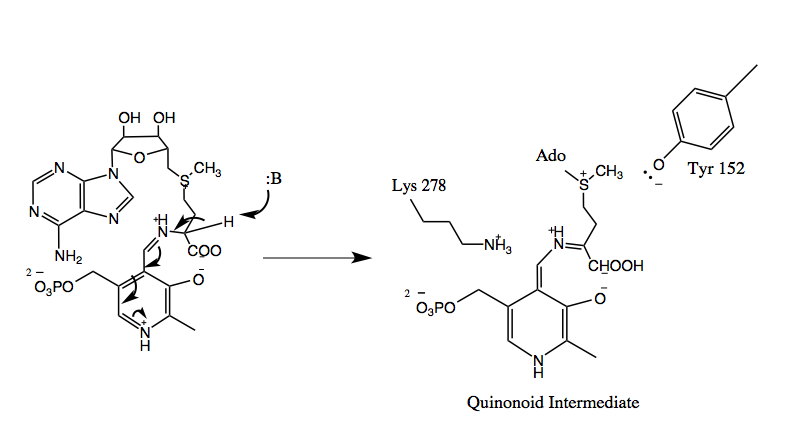
Formation of the Quinonoid Intermediate.

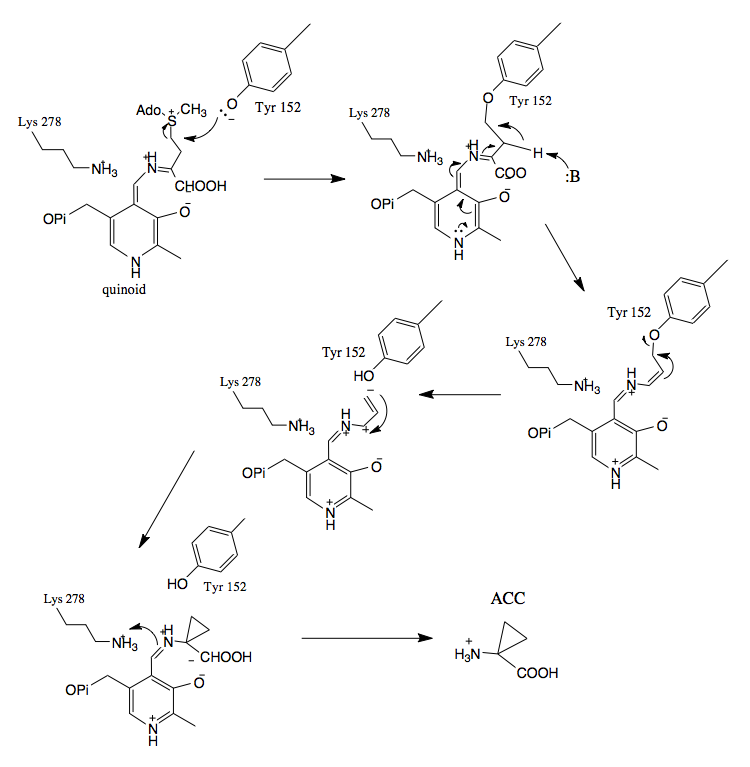
Tyrosine and PLP stabilized 3C-Ring formation.

The reaction catalyzed by 1-aminocyclopropane-1-carboxylic acid synthase (ACS) is the committed and rate-limiting step in the biosynthesis of ethylene [20], a gaseous plant hormone that is responsible for the initiation of fruit ripening, shoot and root growth and differentiation, leaf and fruit abscission, flower opening, and flower and leaf senescence. (source) It is a pyridoxal phosphate (PLP) dependent gamma-elimination (?). In the gamma elimination, PLP acts as a sink twice (absorbing electrons from two deprotonations).

Proposed steps of the reaction mechanism:

1. Formation of the ACS-PLP Schiff Base
2. Imine Exchange
3. Formation of the Quinonoid Intermediate
4. Tyrosine and PLP stabilized 3C-Ring formation

Formation of the ACS-PLP Schiff Base

The aldehyde of coenzyme PLP reacts to form an imine (Schiff base) linkage with the catalytic domain lysine (278) residue of ACS.

Imine exchange

An imine exchange occurs, and the amine nitrogen of the substrate, S-Adenosyl methionine, replaces Lys (278) in the imine linkage. (Stabilized by H bonding).

Formation of the Quinonoid Intermediate

PLP acts as an 'electron sink' absorbing delocalized electron density during the reaction intermediates (countering the excess electron density on the deprotonated a-carbon). PLP facilitates the enzyme activity, increasing the acidity of the alpha carbon by stabilizing the conjugate base. The PLP-stabilized carbanion intermediate formed is the quinonoid intermediate.

Tyrosine and PLP stabilized 3C-Ring formation

PLP and Tyrosine stabilize negative charges during deprotonation. Tyrosine attacks the sulfur bound carbon, allowing S(CH_{3})(Ado) to leave, and during ring formation, Tyrosine leaves.

  - Note inhibitors AVG and AMA bind PLP to form a ketimine and oxime respectively (whose reverse reactions are much less favorable) and prevent the ACC synthase catalyzed reaction with SAM.

== Regulation ==
ACC synthase reaches optimal activity in conditions of pH 8.5 and with Km = 20 um relative to its substrate, SAM.

ACC Synthase and ethylene biosynthesis are regulated by a whole host of stimuli. Stresses such as wounding, noxious chemicals, auxin, flooding, and indole-3-acetic acid (IAA) promote ethylene synthesis, creating a positive feedback cycle with ACC synthase, up-regulating its activity.

However, it is also inhibited by a number of compounds as well. S-Adenosylethionine can bind as a substrate for ACC synthase (with higher affinity than SAM) and therefore inhibit any reaction with SAM. ACC Synthase is also competitively inhibited by aminoethoxyvinylglycine (AVG) and aminooxyacetic acid (AOA), inhibitors to many pyridoxal phosphate-mediated enzymic reactions. They are natural toxins that cause slow binding inhibition by interfering with the coenzyme pyridoxal phosphate. ACC synthase activity is also inhibited by intermediates of the activated methyl cycle and the methionine-recycling pathway: 5′-methylthioadenosine, α-keto-γ-methylthiobutyric acid, and S-adenosylhomocysteine.

== Structure ==
ACC Synthase is 450-516 amino acid long sequence depending on the species of plant from which it is extracted. Though it is comparable in the species in which it is found, its COOH-terminal domain is more variable, leading to differences such as oligomerization. The COOH-terminal domain is responsible for oligomerization. In most ACC Synthase producing cells, ACC Synthase exists as a dimer. However, in some we find a monomer ("which is more active and efficient [than its dimer counterpart").

The structure of ACS has been largely determined via X-ray crystallography. Conservation of the residues in ACS's catalytic domain and sequence homology suggest that ACS catalyzes the synthesis of ACC in a similar fashion as other enzymes that require PLP as a cofactor. However, unlike many other PLP-dependent enzymes, Lys (278) is not the only residue that interacts with the substrate. The proximity of the electronegative oxygen from Tyr (152) to the C-γ-S bond suggests a crucial role in the formation of ACC. X-ray crystallography with aminoethoxyvinylglycine (AVG) a competitive inhibitor confirmed Tyrosine's role in the γ elimination.

As of late 2007, 6 structures have been solved for this class of enzymes, with PDB accession codes PDB: 1B8G, PDB: 1IAX, PDB: 1IAY, PDB: 1M4N, PDB: 1M7Y, and PDB: 1YNU.

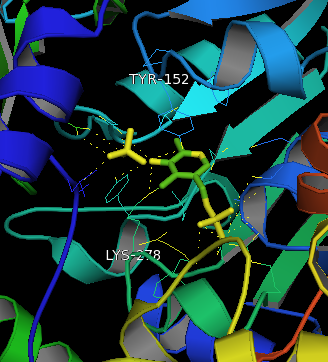
Lysine and Tyrosine Residues in the Substrate Binding Site

== Catalytic domain ==
The main functional groups in the catalytic domains are the Nitrogen from the Lys 278 residue and the Oxygen from the Tyrosine 152 residue.

== Biological function and applications ==
ACC Synthase is the key, rate limiting step in ethylene synthesis. Because the up-regulation of ACC-Synthase is what induces fruit ripening and often spoilage there is more research being done on the regulatory mechanisms and biosynthetic pathways of ethylene to avoid spoilage.
