= 1-Aminocyclopropane-1-carboxylic acid =

Names
- Preferred IUPAC name 1-Aminocyclopropane-1-carboxylic acid
- Other names 1-Aminocyclopropanecarboxylic acid

Identifiers
| CAS Number | 22059-21-8 |
| 3D model (JSmol) | : Interactive image; Interactive image |
| Abbreviations | ACC |
| ChEBI | CHEBI:58360 |
| ChEMBL | ChEMBL265325 |
| ChemSpider | 520 |
| DrugBank | DB02085 |
| ECHA InfoCard | 100.108.227 |
| KEGG | C01234 |
| PubChem CID | 535 |
| UNII | 3K9EJ633GL |
| CompTox Dashboard (EPA) | DTXSID9039577 |
- InChI: InChI=1S/C4H7NO2/c5-4(1-2-4)3(6)7/h1-2,5H2,(H,6,7) Key: PAJPWUMXBYXFCZ-UHFFFAOYSA-N; InChI=1/C4H7NO2/c5-4(1-2-4)3(6)7/h1-2,5H2,(H,6,7) Key: PAJPWUMXBYXFCZ-UHFFFAOYAF
- SMILES: : C(O)(=O)C1(CC1)(N); O=C(O)C1(N)CC1

Properties
| Chemical formula | C_{4}H_{7}NO_{2} |
| Molar mass | 101.1 ^{c} |
| Melting point | 198–201 °C (388–394 °F; 471–474 K) |
- Except where otherwise noted, data are given for materials in their standard state (at 25 °C [77 °F], 100 kPa). verify (what is ?) Infobox references

1-Aminocyclopropane-1-carboxylic acid (ACC) is a disubstituted cyclic α-amino acid in which a cyclopropane ring is fused to the C_{α} atom of the amino acid. It is a white solid. Many cyclopropane-substituted amino acids are known, but this one occurs naturally in various fruits. Like glycine, but unlike most α-amino acids, ACC is not chiral.

== Biochemistry ==
ACC is the precursor to the plant hormone ethylene. It is synthesized by the enzyme ACC synthase (EC 4.4.1.14) from methionine and converted to ethylene by ACC oxidase (EC 1.14.17.4).

ACC also exhibits ethylene-independent signaling that plays a critical role in pollination and seed production by activating proteins similar to those involved in nervous system responses in humans and animals. More specifically, ACC signaling promotes secretion of the pollen tube chemoattractant LURE1.2 in ovular sporophytic tissue thus enhancing pollen tube attraction. Additionally, ACC activates Ca^{2+}-containing ion currents via glutamate receptor-like (GLR) channels in root protoplasts.

ACC can be used by soil microorganisms (both bacteria and fungi) as a source of nitrogen and carbon. As such, using ACC to incubate soils has been proven to induce the gene abundance encoding ACC-deaminases, which may have positive consequences on plant growth and stress tolerance.

ACC has also been extracted from kelp.

ACC is also an exogenous partial agonist of the mammalian NMDA receptor.

In 2019, the United States Environmental Protection Agency issued notice of an application for an experimental use permit to be issued for use of ACC as a pesticide.
