= Abate Fetel =

Pear cultivar

'Abate Fetel' pear
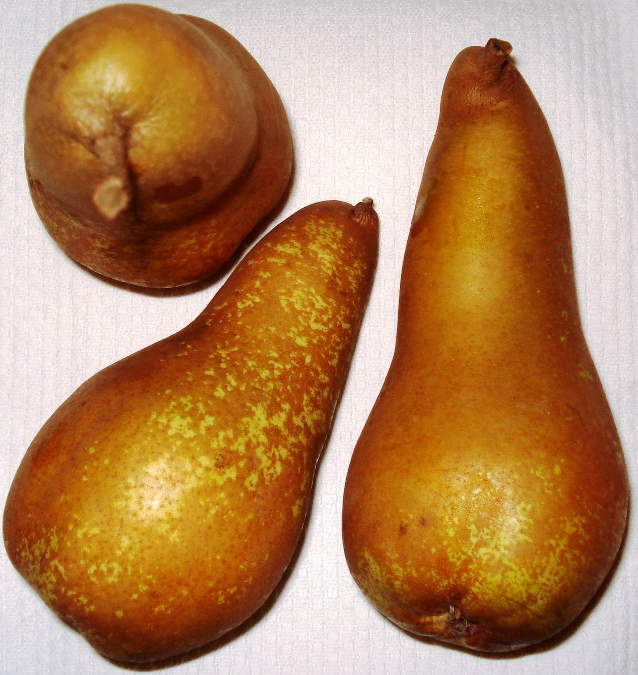
- Abate Fetel pear
- Genus: Pyrus
- Species: Pyrus communis
- Cultivar: 'Abate Fetel'
- Breeder: Fetel
- Origin: France, after 1865

The Abate Fetel or Abbé Fetel is a cultivar of the European Pear (Pyrus communis).

Originally of France, it was obtained by the abbot Fetel – hence the name – who started working on it in 1865, when he was the priest of Chessy, Rhône, using several local cultivars as a starting point. Fetel was later transferred to Charentay, where he continued his hybridisations, ultimately obtaining the 'Abate Fetel' after a few years.

Nowadays, the 'Abate Fetel' pear is the most produced and exported pear cultivar in Italy. It is mostly cultivated in the Emilia-Romagna region, which is a Protected Geographical Indication for this cultivar. Another important producer country is Argentina.

In Italy, the 'Abate Fetel' is usually harvested in September; it maintains its quality for up to 23 weeks of cold storage. A characteristic feature is its elongated shape, which is easily recognizable by consumers.
