= Climacteric (botany) =

Stage of ripening in some fruits

Generally, fleshy fruits can be divided into two groups based on the presence or absence of a respiratory increase at the onset of ripening. This respiratory increase—which is preceded, or accompanied, by a rise in ethylene—is called a climacteric, and there are marked differences in the development of climacteric and non-climacteric fruits. Climacteric fruit can be either monocots or dicots and the ripening of these fruits can still be achieved even if the fruit has been harvested at the end of their growth period (prior to ripening on the parent plant). Non-climacteric fruits ripen without ethylene and respiration bursts, the ripening process is slower, and for the most part they will not be able to ripen if the fruit is not attached to the parent plant. Examples of climacteric fruits include apples, pears, bananas, melons, apricots, and tomatoes, as well as most stone fruits. Non-climacteric fruits include citrus fruits, grapes, and strawberries. (However, non-climacteric melons and apricots do exist, and grapes and strawberries harbor several active ethylene receptors.) A key difference between climacteric and non-climacteric fruits (particularly for commercial production) is that climacteric fruits continue to ripen following their harvest, whereas non-climacteric fruits do not. The accumulation of starch over the early stages of climacteric fruit development may be a key issue, for starch can be converted to sugars after harvest.

== Overview ==
The climacteric stage of fruit ripening is associated with increased ethylene production and a rise in cellular respiration and is the final physiological process that marks the end of fruit maturation and the beginning of fruit senescence. Its defining point is a sudden rise in respiration of the fruit, and normally takes place without any external influences. After the climacteric period, respiration rates (noted by carbon dioxide production) return to or dip below the pre-climacteric rates. The climacteric event also leads to other changes in the fruit, including pigment changes and sugar release. For those fruits raised as food, the climacteric event marks the peak of edible ripeness, with fruits having the best taste and texture for consumption. After the event, fruits are more susceptible to fungal invasion and begin to degrade by cell death. If a fruit were to over-ripen, it could be detrimental to the post harvest of the fruit, meaning the shipment and storage of the fruits for marketing. The over ripening could also lead to a pathogen attack, which can lead to the fruits developing diseases and exhibiting symptoms like necrosis and leaf wilting.

Recent research on ethylene production and perception systems seems to show that this simple classification (fruit ripening that needs ethylene means climacteric vs. fruit ripening that does not need ethylene means non-climacteric) is not completely satisfactory: for example, there are non-climacteric varieties of melon (although almost all of them are climacteric), and grapes (classified as non-climacteric) have many ethylene-sensitive receptors, the expression of which is modulated during ripening.

== Ethylene production ==
Ethylene is a hormone in plants known for its role in accelerating the ripening of fleshy fruits. There are two systems, depending on the stage of development, for ethylene production in climacteric fruit. The first system occurs in immature climacteric fruit, where ethylene will inhibit the biosynthesis of more ethylene by a negative feedback system. This ensures that the fruit does not begin to undergo ripening until it is fully mature. The second system for ethylene production acts in mature climacteric fruit. In this autocatalytic system, the ethylene will promote its own biosynthesis and will make sure that the fruit will ripen evenly after the ripening begins. In other words, a small amount of ethylene in mature, climacteric fruits, will cause a burst of ethylene production and induce even ripening. The generation and progression of this temporal ethylene signal is controlled by a range of epigenetic mechanisms.

Ethylene production begins with the S-adenosylation of methionine (Met) to S-Adenosyl methionine (SAM) by SAM synthetase. SAM is then converted into 1-aminocyclopropane-1-carboxylic acid (ACC) and 5ʹ-methylthioadenosine by ACC synthase. 5ʹ-methylthioadenosine is then recycled back into Met, and the ACC is oxidised to ethylene by ACC oxidase. Along with the production and control of ethylene, auxin also plays a major role in climacteric fruits as it is accumulated during the initial growth and development.

Ripening includes many changes in fleshy fruit including changes in color, texture, and firmness. Additionally, there may be an increase in certain volatiles (metabolites the plant releases into the air) as well as changes in sugar (starch, sucrose, glucose, fructose, etc.) and acid (malic, citric, and ascorbic) balance. These changes, particularly in sugars, are important in determining fruit quality and sweetness.

== List of climacteric and non-climacteric fruits ==
=== Climacteric fruits ===
- Apples
- Apricots
- Avocados
- Bananas
- Cantaloupes
- Cherimoyas
- Durians
- Guavas
- Kiwifruits
- Mangos
- Papayas
- Passion fruits
- Pawpaws
- Peaches (including nectarines)
- Pears
- Persimmons
- Plums
- Tomatoes

=== Non-climacteric fruits ===
- Blackberries
- Blueberries
- Cherries
- Citrus fruits
- Cranberries
- Cucumber
- Dates
- Eggplant
- Grapes
- Lychee
- Okra
- Peas
- Peppers
- Pineapples
- Pomegranates
- Raspberries
- Strawberries
- Summer squash
- Syzygium (Rose apples, Brush cherries etc.)
- Tamarillos
- Watermelon

Some fruits can display climacteric or non-climacteric behavior depending on cultivar or genotype, and the two categories may not be able to perfectly distinguish the ripening behaviors of all fruits.
