= Aminooxyacetic acid =

Names
- Preferred IUPAC name (Aminooxy)acetic acid
- Other names Carboxymethoxylamine; Hydroxylamineacetic acid U-7524

Identifiers
CAS Number	645-88-5
3D model (JSmol)	Interactive image; Interactive image
ChEMBL	ChEMBL347862
ChemSpider	280
DrugBank	DB02079
IUPHAR/BPS	5136
MeSH	Aminooxyacetic+Acid
PubChem CID	286
UNII	14I68GI3OQ
CompTox Dashboard (EPA)	DTXSID50214756
- InChI: InChI=1S/C2H5NO3/c3-6-1-2(4)5/h1,3H2,(H,4,5) Key: NQRKYASMKDDGHT-UHFFFAOYSA-N; InChI=1/C2H5NO3/c3-6-1-2(4)5/h1,3H2,(H,4,5) Key: NQRKYASMKDDGHT-UHFFFAOYAB
- SMILES: O=C(O)CON; NOCC(O)=O

Properties
Chemical formula	C_{2}H_{5}NO_{3}
Molar mass	91.066
Density	1.375 g/cm^{3}
Melting point	138 °C (280 °F; 411 K)
Boiling point	326.7 °C (620.1 °F; 599.8 K)

Hazards
Flash point	151 °C (304 °F; 424 K)
- Except where otherwise noted, data are given for materials in their standard state (at 25 °C [77 °F], 100 kPa). (what is ?) Infobox references

Aminooxyacetic acid, often abbreviated AOA or AOAA, is a compound that inhibits 4-aminobutyrate aminotransferase (GABA-T) activity in vitro and in vivo, leading to less gamma-aminobutyric acid (GABA) being broken down. Subsequently, the level of GABA is increased in tissues. At concentrations high enough to fully inhibit 4-aminobutyrate aminotransferase activity, aminooxyacetic acid is indicated as a useful tool to study regional GABA turnover in rats.

Aminooxyacetic acid is a general inhibitor of pyridoxal phosphate (PLP)-dependent enzymes (this includes GABA-T). It functions as an inhibitor by attacking the Schiff base linkage between PLP and the enzyme, forming oxime type complexes.

Aminooxyacetic acid inhibits aspartate aminotransferase, another PLP-dependent enzyme, which is an essential part of the malate-aspartate shuttle. The inhibition of the malate-aspartate shuttle prevents the reoxidation of cytosolic NADH by the mitochondria in nerve terminals. Also in the nerve terminals, aminooxyacetic acid prevents the mitochondria from utilizing pyruvate generated from glycolysis, thus leading to a bioenergetic state similar to that of hypoglycemia. Aminooxyacetic acid has been shown to cause excitotoxic lesions of the striatum, similar to Huntington's disease, potentially due to its impairment of mitochondrial energy metabolism. Aminooxyacetic acid was previously used in a clinical trial to reduce symptoms of Huntington's disease by increasing GABA levels in the brain. However, the patients who received the aminooxyacetic acid treatment failed to show clinical improvement and suffered from side effects such as drowsiness, ataxia, seizures, and psychosis when the dosage was increased beyond 2 mg per kilogram per day. Also, the inhibition of aspartate aminotransferase by aminooxyacetic acid has clinical implications for the treatment of breast cancer, since a decrease in glycolysis disrupts breast adenocarcinoma cells more than normal cells.

Aminooxyacetic acid has been studied as a treatment for tinnitus. One study showed that about 20% of patients with tinnitus had a decrease in its severity when treated with aminooxyacetic acid. However, about 70% of those patients reported side effects, mostly nausea and disequilibrium. Thus, the investigators of the study concluded that the incidence of the side effects makes aminooxyacetic acid unsuitable to treat tinnitus.

Aminooxyacetic acid also has anticonvulsant properties. At high dosages, it can act as a convulsant agent in mice and rats.

Aminooxyacetic acid can also inhibit 1-aminocyclopropane-1-carboxylate synthase preventing ethylene synthesis, which can increase the vase life of cut flowers.

== History ==
Aminooxyacetic acid was first described by Werner in 1893, and was prepared by the hydrolysis of ethylbenzhydroximinoacetic acid. In 1936, Anchel and Shoenheimer used aminooxyacetic acid to isolate ketones from natural sources. Also in 1936, Kitagawa and Takani described the preparation of aminooxyacetic acid by the condensation of benzhydroxamic acid and ethyl bromoacetate, followed by hydrolysis by hydrochloric acid.
