= Ripening =

Process in fruits that causes them to become more palatable

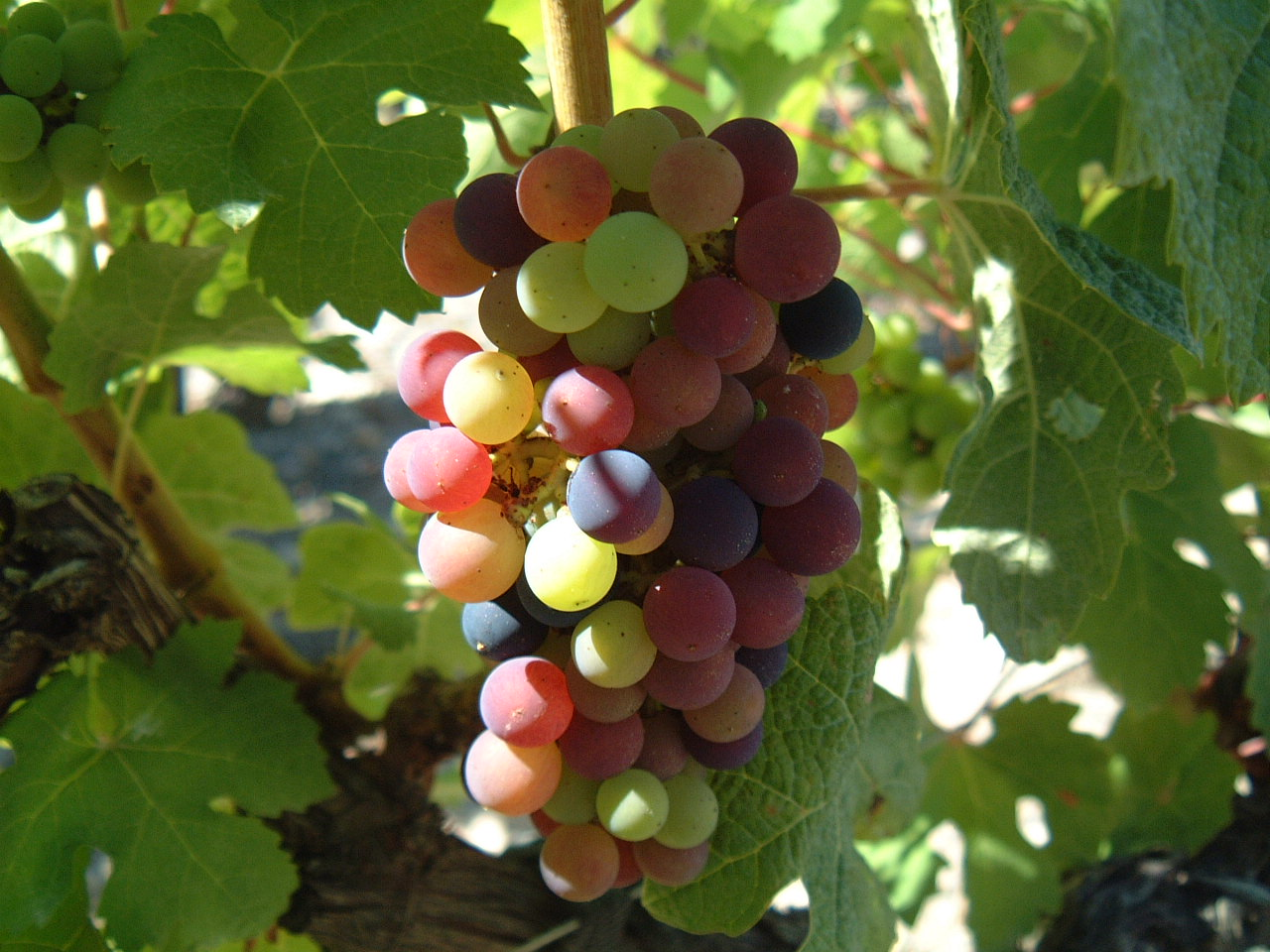
A bunch of Cabernet Sauvignon wine grapes at varying levels of ripeness

Ripening is a process in fruits that causes them to become more palatable. In general, fruit becomes sweeter, less green, and softer as it ripens. Even though the acidity of fruit increases as it ripens, the higher acidity level does not make the fruit seem tarter. This effect is attributed to the Brix-Acid Ratio. Climacteric fruits ripen after harvesting and so some fruits for market are picked green (e.g. bananas and tomatoes).

Underripe fruits are also fibrous, not as juicy, and have tougher outer flesh than ripe fruits (see Mouth feel). Eating unripe fruit can sometimes lead to stomachache or stomach cramps, and ripeness affects the palatability of fruit.

== Science ==
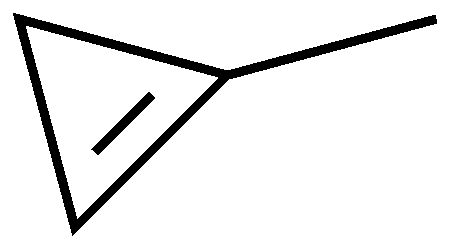
1‑Methylcyclopropene is used as a synthetic plant growth regulator.

Developing fruits produce compounds like alkaloids and tannins. These compounds are antifeedants, meaning that they discourage animals who would eat them while they are still ripening. This mechanism is used to make sure that fruit is not eaten before the seeds are fully developed.

At the molecular level, a variety of different plant hormones and proteins are used to create a negative feedback cycle which keeps the production of ethylene in balance as the fruit develops.

== Agents ==
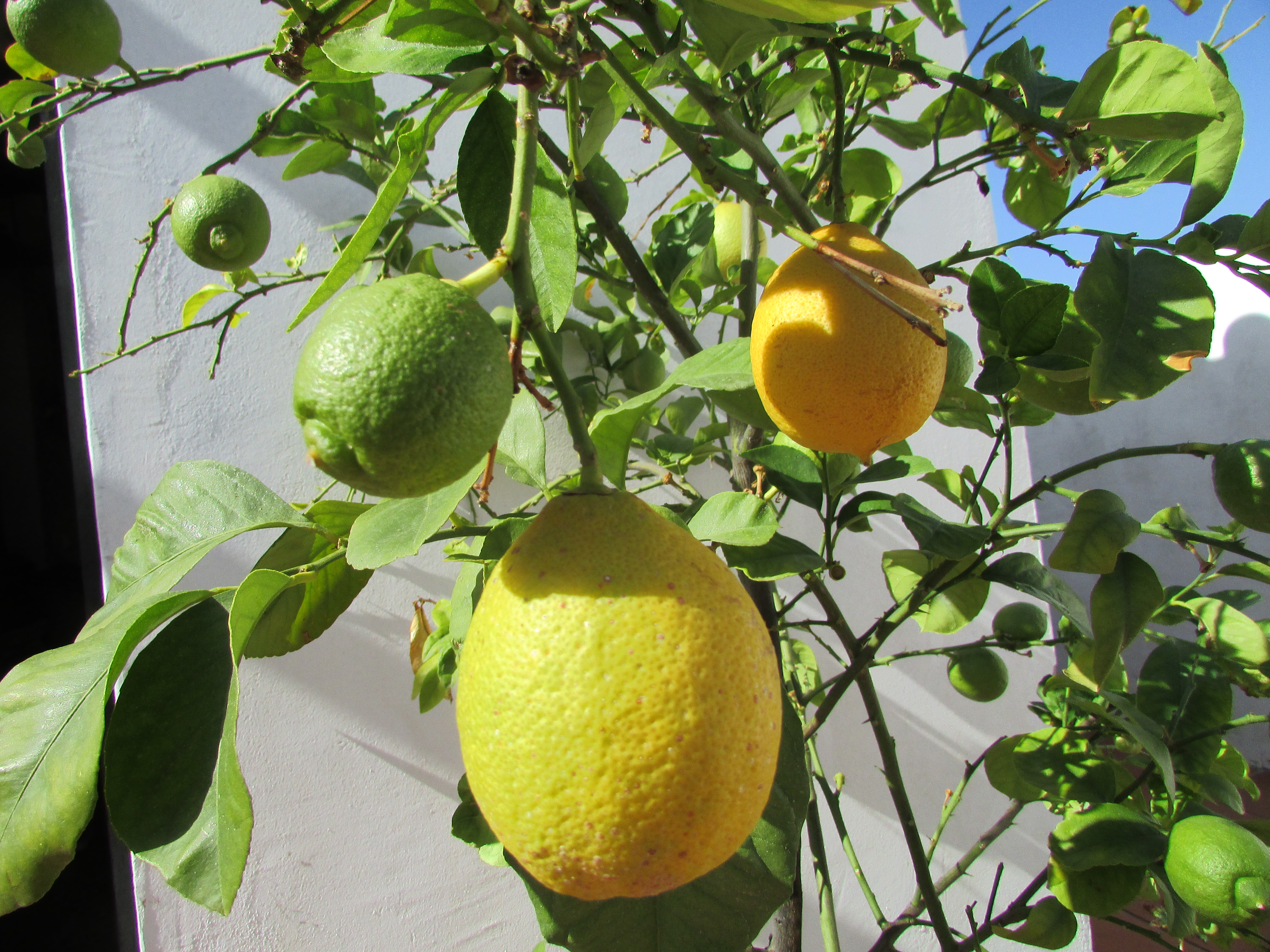
Lemons turn yellow as they ripen.

Ripening agents accelerate ripening. An important ripening agent is ethylene, a gaseous hormone produced by many plants. Many synthetic analogues of ethylene are available. They allow many fruits to be picked prior to full ripening, which is useful since ripened fruits do not ship well. For example, bananas are picked when green and artificially ripened after shipment by being exposed to ethylene. Catalytic generators are used to produce ethylene gas simply and safely. Ethylene sensors can be used to precisely control the amount of gas. Covered fruit ripening bowls or bags are commercially available. These containers increase the amount of ethylene and carbon dioxide gases around the fruit, which promotes ripening.

Calcium carbide is also used in some countries for artificially ripening fruit. When calcium carbide comes in contact with moisture, it produces acetylene gas, which is similar in its effects to the natural ripening agent, ethylene. Acetylene accelerates the ripening process. Use of Calcium carbide is illegal in most developed countries, due to contamination leading to production of the highly toxic compounds phosphine and arsine.

Climacteric fruits continue ripening after being picked, a process accelerated by ethylene gas. Non-climacteric fruits can ripen only on the plant and thus have a short shelf life if harvested when they are ripe.

== Indicators ==
Iodine (I) can be used to determine whether fruits are ripening or rotting by showing whether the starch in the fruit has turned into sugar. For example, a drop of iodine on a slightly rotten part (not the skin) of an apple will stay yellow or orange, since starch is no longer present. If the iodine is applied and takes 2–3 seconds to turn dark blue or black, then the process of ripening has begun but is not yet complete. If the iodine becomes black immediately, then most of the starch is still present at high concentrations in the sample, and hence the fruit has not fully started to ripen.

== Stages ==
Climacteric fruits undergo a number of changes during fruit ripening. The major changes include fruit softening, sweetening, decreased bitterness, and colour change. These changes begin in an inner part of the fruit, the locule, which is the gel-like tissue surrounding the seeds. Ripening-related changes initiate in this region once seeds are viable enough for the process to continue, at which point ripening-related changes occur in the next successive tissue of the fruit called the pericarp. As this ripening process occurs, working its way from the inside towards outer most tissue of the fruit, the observable changes of softening tissue, and changes in color and carotenoid content occur. Specifically, this process activates ethylene production and the expression of ethylene-response genes affiliated with the phenotypic changes seen during ripening. Colour change is the result of pigments, which were always present in the fruit, becoming visible when chlorophyll is degraded. However, additional pigments are also produced by the fruit as it ripens.

In fruit, the cell walls are mainly composed of polysaccharides including pectin. During ripening, a lot of the pectin is converted from a water-insoluble form to a soluble one by certain degrading enzymes. These enzymes include polygalacturonase. This means that the fruit will become less firm as the structure of the fruit is degraded.

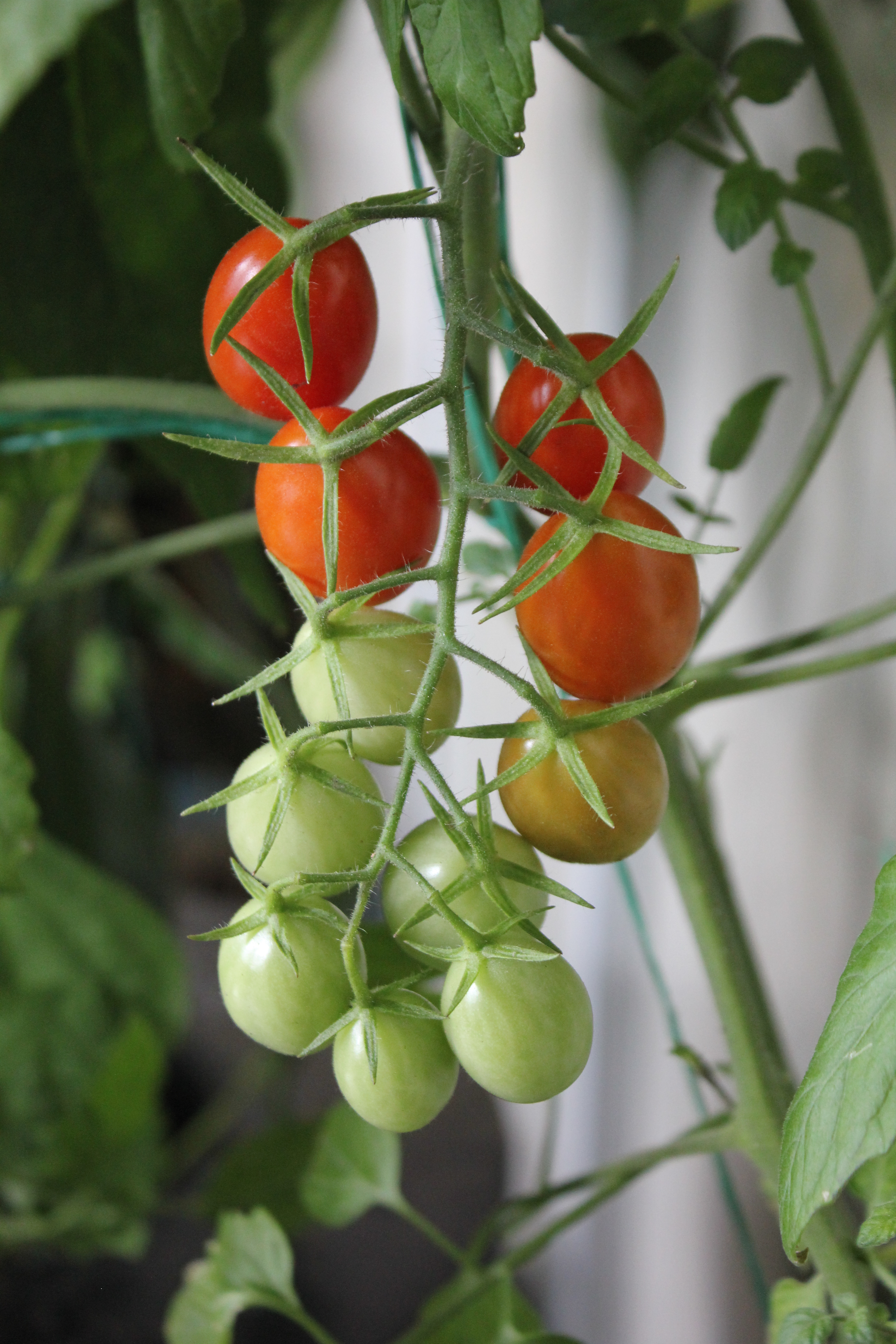
Ripening grape tomatoes in multiple stages

Enzymatic Breakdown and hydrolysis of storage polysaccharides occurs during ripening. The main storage polysaccharides include starch. These are broken down into shorter, water-soluble molecules such as fructose, glucose and sucrose. During fruit ripening, gluconeogenesis also increases.

Acids are broken down in ripening fruits and this contributes to the sweeter rather than sharp tastes associated with unripe fruits. In some fruits such as guava, there is a steady decrease in vitamin C as the fruit ripens. This is mainly as a result of the general decrease in acid content that occurs when a fruit ripens.

=== Tomatoes ===
Different fruits have different ripening stages. In tomatoes the ripening stages are:

- Green: When the surface of the tomato is completely green
- Breaker: When less than 11% of the surface is red
- Turning: When less than 31% of the surface is red (but not less than 11%)
- Pink: When less than 61% of the surface is red (but not less than 31%)
- Light Red: When less than 91% of the surface is red (but not less than 61%)
- Red: When the surface is nearly completely red.

== Lists of climacteric and non-climacteric fruits ==
This is an incomplete list of fruits that ripen after picking (climacteric) and those that do not (non-climacteric).

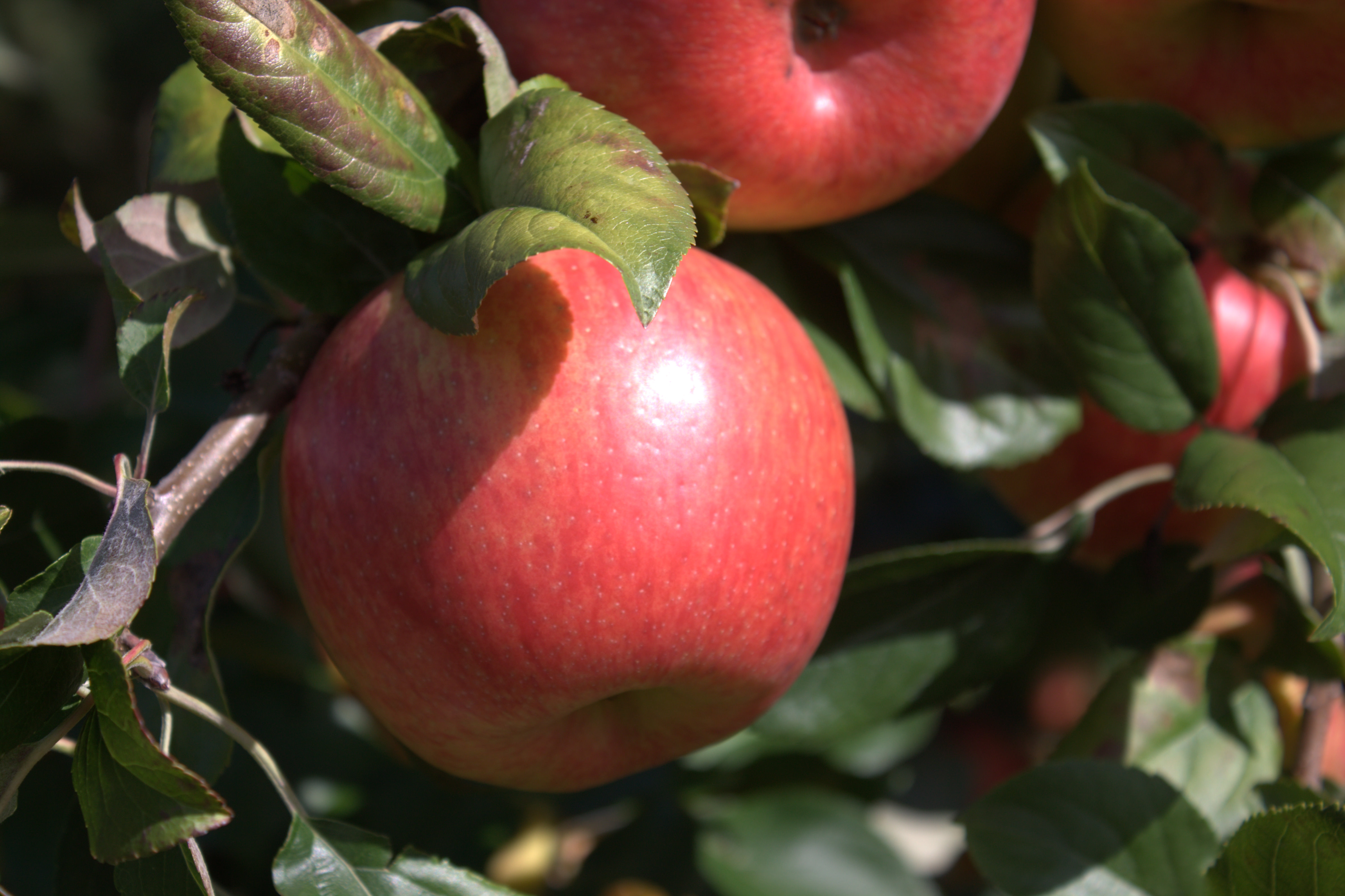
Honeycrisp apples

=== Climacteric ===
- Apple
- Apricot
- Avocado, mature on the tree, but only ripen after being picked
- Banana
- Cantaloupe
- Guava
- Honeydew melon
- Kiwifruit
- Mango
- Nectarine
- Papaya
- Passionfruit
- Peach
- Pear
- Persimmon
- Plum
- Tomato
- Date
- Mulberry

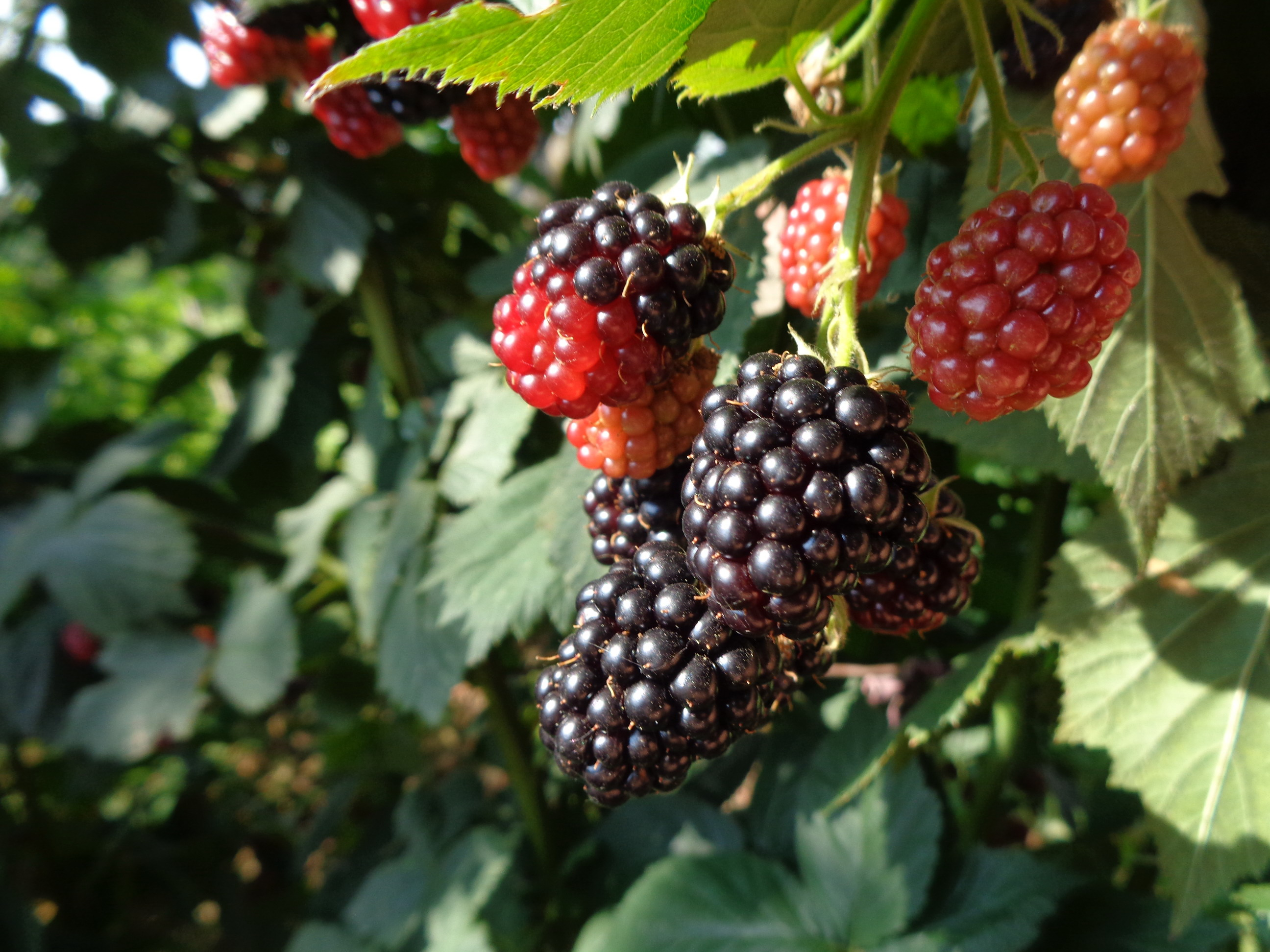
Cultivated blackberries at various stages of ripeness: unripe (pale), ripening (red), and ripe (black)

=== Non-climacteric ===
- Berries:
  - Blackberry
  - Blackcurrant
  - Blueberry
  - Gooseberry
  - Raspberry
  - Strawberry
- Cherry
- Fig
- Grape
- Olive
- Rambutan
- Asimina triloba (pawpaw)
- Summer squash
- Watermelon
- Coconut
- Citrus
- Pineapple
- Pomegranate

== Regulation ==
There are two patterns of fruit ripening: climacteric that is induced by ethylene and non-climacteric that occurs independently of ethylene. This distinction can be useful in determining the ripening processes of various fruits, since climacteric fruits continue ripening after they are removed due to the presence of ethylene, while nonclimacteric fruits only ripen while still attached to the plant. In non-climacteric fruits, auxins act to inhibit ripening. They do this by repressing genes involved in cell modification and anthocyanin synthesis. Ripening can be induced by abscisic acid, specifically the process of sucrose accumulation as well as color acquisition and firmness. While ethylene plays a major role in the ripening of climacteric plants, it still has effects in non-climacteric species as well. In strawberries, it was shown to stimulate color and softening processes. Studies found that the addition of exogenous ethylene induces secondary ripening processes in strawberries, stimulating respiration. They suggested that this process involves ethylene receptors, a type of gasoreceptor, that may vary between climacteric and non-climacteric fruits.

=== Methyl jasmonate ===
Jasmonate is involved in multiple aspects of the ripening process in non-climacteric fruits. This class of hormones includes jasmonic acid and methyl jasmonate. Studies showed that the expression of genes involved in various pathways in ripening was increased with the addition of methyl jasmonate. This study found that methyl jasmonate led to an increase in red coloration and the accumulation of lignin and anthocyanins, which can be used as ripening indicators. The genes they analyzed include those involved in anthocyanin accumulation, cell wall modification, and ethylene synthesis; all of which promote fruit ripening.

=== Abscisic acid ===
ABA also plays an important role in the ripening of non-climacteric plants. It has been shown to increase the rate of ethylene production and anthocyanin concentrations. Ripening was enhanced, as seen with the accelerated fruit coloration and softening. This occurs because ABA acts as a regulator of ethylene production, increasing synthesis similarly to climacteric fruits.

== See also ==
- Bletting, a post-ripening reaction that some fruits undergo before they are edible
- Cervical ripening, when the pregnant human cervix degrades collagen and proteins and then changes shape prior to delivery
