= Carbon monoxide-releasing molecules =

Substances delivering CO within the body

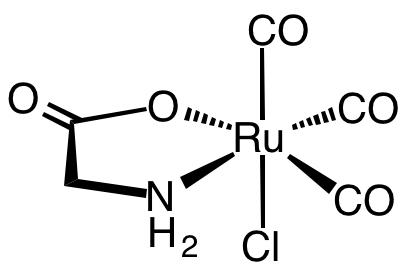
Structure of RuCl(gly)(CO)_{3}, known as CORM-3.

Carbon monoxide-releasing molecules (CORMs) are chemical compounds designed to release controlled amounts of carbon monoxide (CO). CORMs are being developed as potential therapeutic agents to locally deliver CO to cells and tissues, thus overcoming limitations of CO gas inhalation protocols.

CO is best known for its toxicity in carbon monoxide poisoning at high doses. However, CO is a gasotransmitter and supplemental low dosage of CO has been linked to therapeutic benefits. Pre-clinical research has focused on CO's anti-inflammatory activity with significant applications in cardiovascular disease, oncology, transplant surgery, and neuroprotection.

== History ==
Therapeutic interest in low dose CO dates back to the study of factitious airs in the 1790s by Thomas Beddoes, James Watt, James Lind, Humphry Davy, Tiberius Cavallo and many others.

Nickel tetracarbonyl was the first carbonyl-complex used to achieve local delivery of CO and was the first CO delivery molecule suggested to have therapeutic potential in 1891. The acronym CORM was coined in 2002, which marks the first modern biomedical and pharmaceutical initiative. The enzymatic reaction of heme oxygenase inspired the development of synthetic CORMs.

The first synthetic CORMs were typically metal carbonyl complexes. A representative CORM that has been extensively characterized both from a biochemical and pharmacological view point is the ruthenium(II) complex Ru(glycinate)Cl(CO)_{3}, known as CORM-3. Therapeutic data pertaining to metallic CORMs were reappraised to explore if observed effects are due to CO or if metal reactivity mediates physiological effects via thiol depletion, facilitating reduction, ion channel blockage, or redox catalysis.

== CORM classifications ==
=== Transition metal CORMs ===
The majority of therapeutically relevant CORMs are transition metal complexes primarily based on iron, molybdenum, ruthenium, manganese, cobalt, and rhenium.

=== PhotoCORMs ===
The release of CO from carrier agents can be induced photochemically. These carriers are called photoCORMs and include both metal complexes and metal-free (organic) compounds of various structural motifs classified as a special type of photolabile protecting group.

=== ET-CORMs ===
Enzyme-triggered CORMs (ET-CORMs) have been developed to improve selective local delivery of CO. Some ET-CORM prodrugs are activated by esterase enzymes for site specific liberation of CO.

=== CO prodrugs ===
Methylene chloride was the first organic CORM orally administered based on previous reports of carboxyhemoglobin formation via metabolism. The second organic CORM, CORM-A1 (sodium boranocarbonate), was developed based on a 1960s report of CO release from potassium boranocarbonate.

Metal salts of the following acids have been proposed as organic CORMs: deltic acid, squaric acid, croconic acid, and rhodizonic acid.

=== Enzyme hybrids ===
Based on the synergism of the heme oxygenase system and CO delivery, a molecular hybrid-CORM (HYCO) class emerged consisting of a conjoined HO-1 inducer and CORM species. One such HYCO includes a dimethyl fumarate moiety which activates NRF2 to thereby induce HO-1, whilst the CORM moiety also liberates CO.

=== Carbon monoxide releasing materials ===
Carbon monoxide releasing materials (CORMAs) are novel drug formulations and drug delivery platforms which have emerged to overcome the pharmaceutical limitations of most CORM species. Some CORMA consist of a formulation of micelles prepared from triblock copolymers with a CORM entity, which is triggered for release via addition of cysteine. Other CO-releasing scaffolds include polymers, peptides, silica nanoparticles, nanodiamond, magnetic nanoparticles, nanofiber gel, metallodendrimers, and CORM-protein (macromolecule) conjugates.

Other advanced drug delivery devices, such as encapsulated CORMs and extracorporeal membrane-inspired technologies, have been developed.

=== Carboxyhemoglobin infusion ===
Carboxyhemoglobin can be infused to deliver CO. The most common approaches are based on polyethylene glycol PEGylated bovine carboxyhemoglobin and maleimide PEG conjugated human carboxyhemoglobin.

=== Porphyrins ===
Porphyrin structures such as heme, hemin, and metallic protoporphyrin IX (PPIX) analogs (such as cobalt PPIX) have been deployed to induce heme oxygenase and subsequently undergo biotransformation to liberate CO, the inorganic ion, and biliverdin/bilirubin. Some PPIX analogs such as tin PPIX, tin mesoporphyrin, and zinc PPIX, are heme oxygenase inhibitors.

== Endogenous CO ==
HMOX is the main source of endogenous CO production, though other minor contributors have also been identified. CO is formed at a rate of 16.4 μmol/hour in the human body, ~86% originating from heme via heme oxygenase and ~14% from non-heme sources including: photooxidation, lipid peroxidation, and xenobiotics. The average carboxyhemoglobin (CO-Hb) level in a non-smoker is under 3% CO-Hb (whereas a smoker may reach levels near 10% CO-Hb), though geographic location, occupation, health and behavior are contributing variables.

=== Heme oxygenase ===
In the late 1960s Rudi Schmid characterized the enzyme that facilitates the reaction for heme catabolism, thereby identifying the heme oxygenase (HMOX) enzyme.

HMOX is a heme-containing member of the heat shock protein (HSP) family identified as HSP32. Three isoforms of HMOX have been identified to date including the stress-induced HMOX-1 and constitutive HMOX-2. HMOX-1 is considered a cell rescue protein which is induced in response to oxidative stress and numerous disease states. Furthermore, HMOX-1 is induced by countless molecules including statins, hemin, and natural products.

HMOX catalyzes the degradation of heme to biliverdin/bilirubin, ferrous ion, and CO. Though present throughout the body, HO has significant activity in the spleen in the degradation of hemoglobin during erythrocyte recycling (0.8% of the erythrocyte pool per day), which accounts for ~80% of heme derived endogenous CO production. The majority of the remaining 20% of heme derived CO production is attributed to hepatic catabolism of hemoproteins (myoglobin, cytochromes, catalase, peroxidases, soluble guanylate cyclase, nitric oxide synthase) and ineffective erythropoiesis in bone marrow.

The enzymatic velocity and catalytic activity of HMOX can be enhanced by a plethora of dietary substances and xenobiotics to increase CO production.

=== Minor CO sources ===
The formation of CO from lipid peroxidation was first reported in the late 1960s and is regarded as a minor contributor to endogenous CO production. Other contributing sources include: the microbiome, cytochrome P450 reductase, human acireductone dioxygenase, tyrosinase, lipid peroxidation, alpha-keto acids, and other oxidative and redox mechanisms.

== CO pharmacology ==
Carbon monoxide is one of three gaseous signaling molecules alongside nitric oxide and hydrogen sulfide. These gases are collectively referred to as gasotransmitters. CO is a classical example of hormesis such that low-dose is essential and beneficial, whereas an absence or excessive exposure to CO can be toxic.

=== Signaling ===
The first evidence of CO as a signaling molecule occurred upon observation of CO stimulating soluble guanylate cyclase and subsequent cyclic guanosine monophosphate (cGMP) production to serve as a vasodilator in vascular smooth muscle cells. The anti-inflammatory effects of CO are attributed to activation of the p38 mitogen-activated protein kinase (MAPK) pathway. While CO commonly interacts with the ferrous iron atom of heme in a hemoprotein, it has been demonstrated that CO activates calcium-dependent potassium channels by engaging in hydrogen-bonding with surface histidine residues.

CO may have an inhibitory effect on numerous proteins including cytochrome P450 and cytochrome c oxidase.

=== Pharmacokinetics ===
CO has approximately 210x greater affinity for hemoglobin than oxygen. The equilibrium dissociation constant for the reaction Hb-CO ⇌ Hb + CO strongly favours the CO complex, thus the release of CO for pulmonary excretion generally takes some time.

CO is considered non-reactive in the body and primarily undergoes pulmonary excretion.
