= Heme oxygenase =

Class of enzymes

heme oxygenase
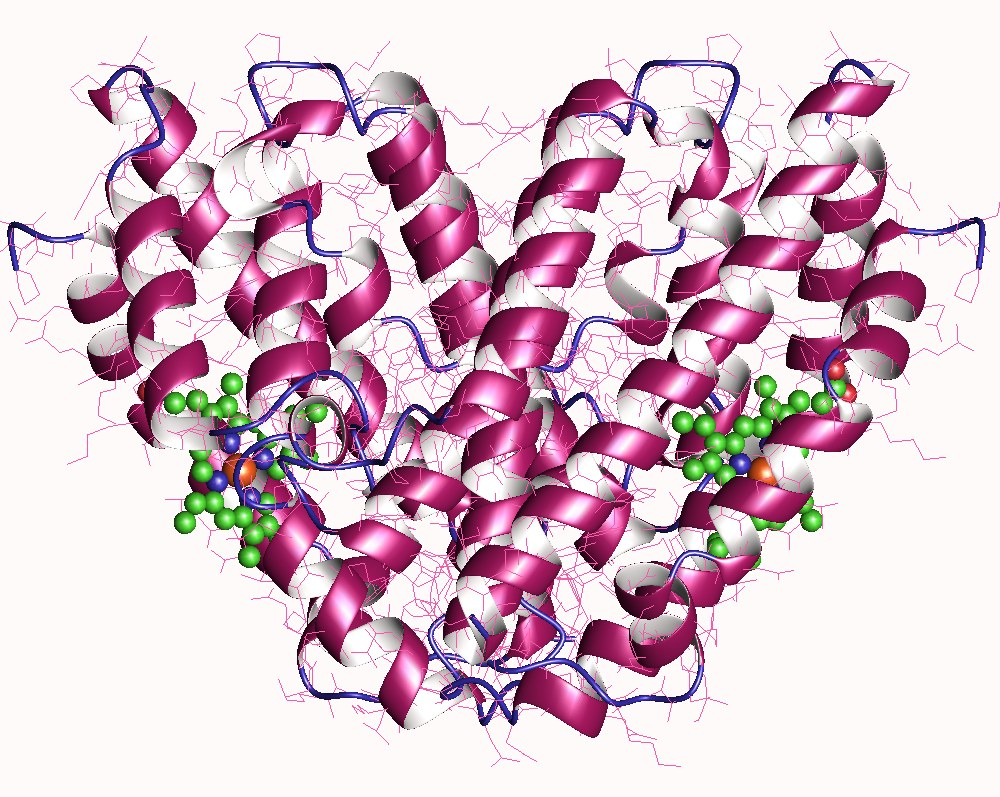
- Heme oxygenase I, homodimer, Human

Identifiers
- EC no.: 1.14.14.18
- CAS no.: 9059-22-7

Databases
- BRENDA: enzyme data
- ExPASy: NiceZyme view
- KEGG: enzyme entry
- MetaCyc: metabolic pathway
- Rhea: reactions
- PDB structures: RCSB PDB PDBe PDBsum
- Gene Ontology: AmiGO / QuickGO
Search
- PMC: articles
- PubMed: articles
- NCBI: proteins

Heme oxygenase
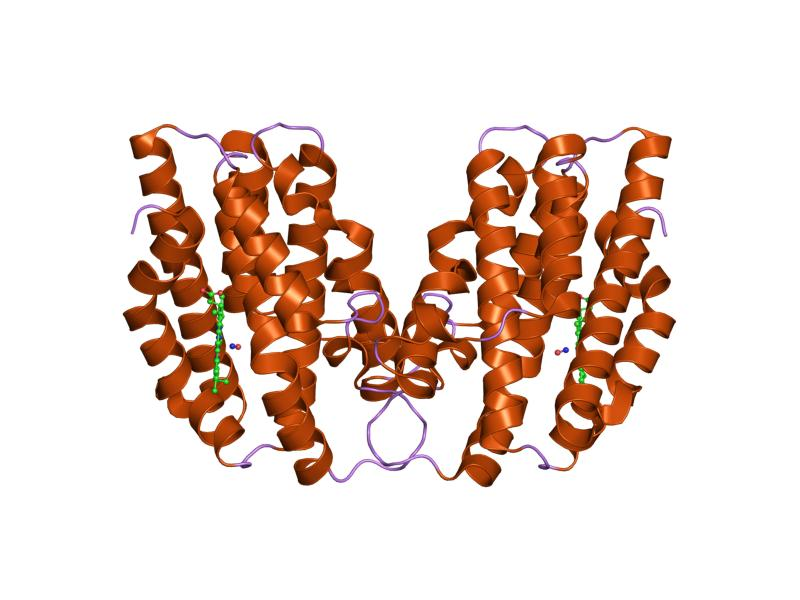
- Crystal structures of ferrous and ferrous-no forms of verdoheme in a complex with human heme oxygenase-1: catalytic implications for heme cleavage

Identifiers
- Symbol: Heme_oxygenase
- Pfam: PF01126
- Pfam clan: CL0230
- InterPro: IPR016053
- PROSITE: PDOC00512
- SCOP2: 1qq8 / SCOPe / SUPFAM
- Membranome: 532
Available protein structures:
- PDB: IPR016053 PF01126 (ECOD; PDBsum)
- AlphaFold: IPR016053; PF01126

Heme oxygenase, or haem oxygenase, (HMOX, commonly abbreviated as HO) is an enzyme that catalyzes the degradation of heme to produce biliverdin, ferrous iron, and carbon monoxide.

There are many heme degrading enzymes in nature. In general, only aerobic heme degrading enzymes are referred to as HMOX-like enzymes whereas anaerobic enzymes are typically not affiliated with the HMOX family.

== Heme oxygenase ==
Heme oxygenase (alternatively spelled using haem or oxidase) catalyzes the degradation of heme to biliverdin/bilirubin, ferrous ion, and carbon monoxide. The human genome may encode three isoforms of HMOX.

The degradation of heme forms three distinct chromogens as seen in healing cycle of a bruise. This reaction can occur in virtually every cell and platelet; the classic example is the healing process of a contusion, which forms different chromogens as it gradually heals: (red) heme to (green) biliverdin to (yellow) bilirubin which is widely known for jaundice. In general, aside from sharing the functionality of catabolizing heme, all HMOX isoforms share are signature 24-residue sequence considered to be essential for the enzymatic activity.

Though present throughout the body, HMOX is most active in the spleen facilitating degradation of hemoglobin during erythrocyte recycling (approximately 0.8% of the erythrocyte pool per day).

=== Heme oxygenase 1 ===
Heme oxygenase 1 (HMOX1, commonly HO-1) is a member of the heat shock protein (HSP) family identified as HSP32. HO-1 is a 32kDa enzyme which contains 288 amino acid residues encoded by the HMOX1 gene. HO-1 is not a hemoprotein as it does not contain any heme prosthetic groups. The activity of HO-1 is dependent upon NADPH-Cytochrome P450 Reductase.

HO-1 is a stress-induced isoform present throughout the body with highest concentrations in the spleen, liver, and kidneys, and on the cellular level is primarily located in the endoplasmic reticulum, although it has also been reported in the mitochondria, cell nucleus, and plasma membrane. Soluble variations of HO-1 have been described. HO-1 may also serve as a chaperone protein, engage in protein-protein interactions, be secreted into the extracellular space, and participate in other cellular functions beyond its catalytic activity. HO-1 may also generate small amounts of carbon suboxide. HO-1 enzymes are degraded via ubiquitination.

The enzyme has been the subject of extensive investigation into its regulatory signaling, immunomodulatory, and cryoprotective roles. HMOX1 is an essential enzyme. Human HMOX1-deficiency is rare, however several cases have been reported which generally results in death.

In certain diseases, HMOX is problematic. For example, HMOX1 may counteract certain chemotherapeutic drugs to rescue cancer cells from cytotoxic drugs thereby enabling cancer progression. HMOX1 inhibitors are in development.

=== Heme oxygenase 2 ===
Heme oxygenase 2 (HMOX2 or HO-2) is a constitutive isoform that is expressed under homeostatic conditions in the testes, gastrointestinal tract, endothelial cells and the brain. HO-2 is encoded by the HMOX2 gene. HO-2 is 36 kDa and shares 47% similarity with the HO-1 amino acid sequence; notably HO-2 has an extra N-terminal stretch of 20 amino acid residues. Unlike HO-1, HO-2 is a hemoprotein containing heme regulatory motifs that contain heme independent of the heme catabolic site.

Whereas HO-1 has innumerable inducers, only adrenal glucocorticoids are known to induce HO-2 whereas certain other molecules may increase its catalytic velocity. Opioids may inhibit HMOX2 activity. Many drugs that activate and inhibit HO-2 are in development.

=== Heme oxygenase 3 ===
A controversial third heme oxygenase (HO-3) is considered to be catalytically inactive and has been speculated to work in heme sensing or detoxification. HO-3 is 33 kDa with greatest presence in the liver, prostate, and kidneys. However, attempts to isolate HO-3 yielded pseudogenes derived from HO-2 transcripts thereby raising questions about the existence of a third isoform.

=== Microbial heme oxygenase ===
Heme oxygenase is conserved across phylogenetic kingdoms. The human microbiome contains dozens of unique microbial HMOX homologues which use many different abbreviations exemplified by:

- HMX1 in Saccharomyces cerevisiae
- HmuO in Corynebacterium diphtheriae
- ChuS in commensal strains of Escherichia coli

A critical role of the prokaryotic HMOX systems is to facilitate acquisition of nutritional iron from a eukaryotic host.

Some heme-degrading prokaryotic enzymes produce products such as formaldehyde rather than CO. As an example, certain pathogens such as Escherichia coli O157:H7 can express the non-CO producing ChuW isoform. Many pathogens are susceptible to CO toxicity, therefore expressing non-CO producing heme degradation enzymes evades self-inflicted toxicity while meeting nutritional iron needs. Commensal microbiota generally have CO tolerance as they produce and respond to CO signals; upon excretion from the microbe, the CO either directly benefits the host or applies selection pressure against pathogens thereby serving as a symbiotic currency.

=== Plant heme oxygenase ===
Plants contain HMOX homologues with critical roles in plant physiology. Although chlorophyll is structurally similar to heme, it is unclear if any HMOX-like enzymes are capable of facilitating metabolism.

=== Quasi-enzymatic heme oxidation ===
As heme oxygenase is an enzymatic catalyst that accelerates the slow natural oxidation of heme, non-enzymatic oxidative degradation of heme, commonly termed 'coupled oxidation', was proposed as early as 1949. Akin to HMOX, coupled oxidation occurs at the alpha-methine bridge and leads to formation of biliverdin although the reaction's stoichiometry is different. The first attempt to describe HMOX in 1962 by Nakajima turned out to be a non-enzymatic pathway. The complexity of the non-enzymatic pathway has been coined quasi-enzymatic or pseudoenzymatic. A variety of mechanisms have been proposed.

== Reaction ==
HMOX1 is the rate-limiting step of heme catabolism that is dependent on NADPH-cytochrome P450 reductase and oxygen to cleave heme/porphyrin ring at the alpha-methene bridge to form biliverdin (or verdoglobin if the heme is still intact as hemoglobin). The reaction comprises three steps, which may be:

Heme b^{3+} + O_{2} + NADPH + H^{+}→ α-meso-hydroxyheme^{3+} + NADP^{+}+ H_{2}O
α-meso-hydroxyheme^{3+} + H^{+}+ O_{2} → verdoheme^{4+} + CO + H_{2}O
verdoheme^{4+} + 7/2 NADPH + O_{2}+ 3/2 H^{+} → biliverdin + Fe^{2+} + 7/2 NADP^{+}+ H_{2}O

The sum of these reactions is:

Heme b^{3+} + 3O_{2} + 9/2 NADPH + 7/2 H^{+} → biliverdin + Fe^{2+} + CO + 9/2 NADP^{+}+ 3H_{2}O

If the iron is initially in the +2 state, the reaction could be:

Heme b^{2+} + 3O_{2} + 4 NADPH + 4 H^{+} → biliverdin + Fe^{2+} + CO + 4 NADP^{+} + 3H_{2}O

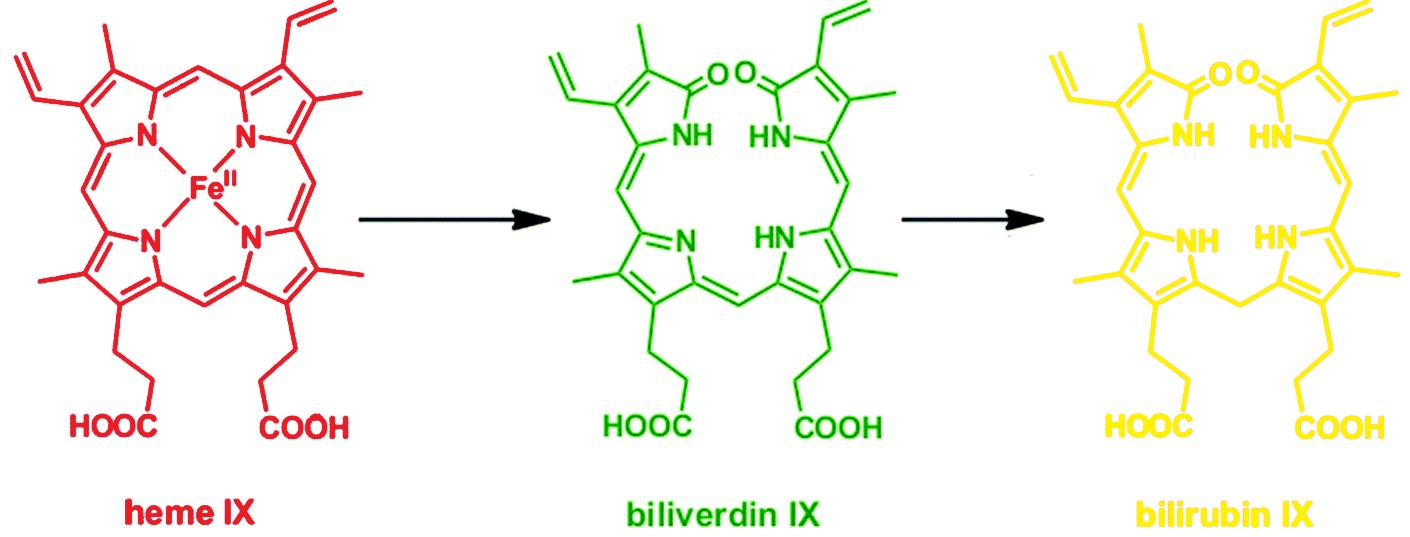
The degradation of heme forms three distinct chromogens as seen in healing cycle of a bruise (note: the standard structure of heme is mirrored in this image, the alpha-methine bridge carbon (c5) is at the top of the structure and the beta methine-bridge carbon (c10) is counterclockwise to the left)

This reaction can occur in virtually every cell; the classic example is the formation of a contusion, which forms different chromogens as it gradually heals: (red) heme to (green) biliverdin to (yellow) bilirubin. In terms of molecular mechanisms, the enzyme facilitates the intramolecular hydroxylation of one meso carbon centre in the heme.

== Modulators ==
=== Inducers ===
HMOX1 is induced by countless molecules including heavy metals, statins, paclitaxel, rapamycin, probucol, nitric oxide, sildenafil, carbon monoxide, carbon monoxide-releasing molecules, and certain porphyrins.

Phytochemical inducers of HO include: curcumin, resveratrol, piceatannol, caffeic acid phenethyl ester, dimethyl fumarate, fumaric acid esters, flavonoids, chalcones, ginkgo biloba, anthrocyanins, phlorotannins, carnosol, rosolic acid, and numerous other natural products.

Endogenous inducers include i) lipids such as lipoxin and epoxyeicosatrienoic acid; and ii) peptides such as adrenomedullin and apolipoprotein; and iii) hemin.

NRF2 inducers with downstream HO-1 induction include: genistein, 3-hydroxycoumarin, oleanolic acid, isoliquiritigenin, PEITC, diallyl trisulfide, oltipraz, benfotiamine, auranofin, acetaminophen, nimesulide, paraquat, ethoxyquin, diesel exhaust particles, silica, nanotubes, 15-deoxy-Δ12,14 prostaglandin J2, nitro-oleic acid, hydrogen peroxide, and succinylacetone.

=== Inhibitors ===
HMOX1 is inhibited by certain porphyrins such as zinc protoporphyrin.

== Roles in physiology ==
HMOX is involved in numerous cellular operations. The cyto-protective benefits of HMOX has stimulated significant research into its therapeutic and pharmaceutical potential. These effects have not been verified in clinical trials.

=== Carbon monoxide ===
HMOX is the main source of endogenous CO production, though other minor contributors have been identified in recent years. CO is formed at a rate of 16.4 μmol/hour in the human body, ~86% originating from heme via heme oxygenase and ~14% from non-heme sources including photooxidation, lipid and keto acid peroxidation, microbiome, and xenobiotics. The average carboxyhemoglobin (CO-Hb) level in a non-smoker is between 0.2% and 0.85% CO-Hb (whereas a smoker may have between 4% and 10% CO-Hb), though genetics, geographic location, occupation, health and behavior are contributing variables.

Erythrocyte recycling in the spleen accounts for ~80% of heme-derived endogenous CO production. The remaining 20% of heme-derived CO production is attributed to hepatic catabolism of hemoproteins (myoglobin, cytochromes, catalase, peroxidases, soluble guanylate cyclase, nitric oxide synthase) and ineffective erythropoiesis in bone marrow.

In addition to being a source of carbon monoxide, heme is a critical signal transducer involved in carbon monoxide sensing. As a signaling agent, carbon monoxide is involved in normal physiology and has therapeutic benefits in many indications such as ameliorating inflammation and hypoxia. The extent to which HMOX is involved in carbon monoxide's protective effect against hypoxia remains under investigation, however, as three molar equivalents of oxygen are required to produce carbon monoxide from heme catabolism, along with the question of heme bioavailability, and slow HMOX1 induction which may take several hours (e.g. the slow healing of a bruise).

=== Biliverdin and bilirubin ===
Ancient documentation for endogenous bilirubin traces back to medical humours written by Hippocrates.

In most cases, HMOX selectively cleaves heme (iron protoporphyrin IX) at the α-methine bridge. The resulting bilirubin contains the suffix IXα to identify the composition of its structure by indicating its parent molecule was protoporphyrin IX cleaved at the alpha position (see protoporphyrin IX for further information on the Fischer nomenclature system). Drosophila melanogaster contains a unique HMOX that is not alpha specific resulting in formation of biliverdin IXα, IXβ, IXδ. Non-enzymatic oxidation of heme is likewise non-specific resulting in ring opening at the α, β, γ, or δ positions.

Biliverdin IXα undergoes biotransformation via biliverdin reductase to form bilirubin IXα. Bilins play important roles across phylogenetic kingdoms.

=== Ferrous ion ===
Ferrous ion is a common nomenclature used in the HMOX field for Iron(II) which appears in PubChem. The iron liberated from HMOX is thought to be rapidly sequestered by ferritin. However, reactive oxygen species generated through the Fenton or Haber-Weiss reactions may enable downstream signaling.

== History ==
HMOX1 was first characterized by Tenhunen and Rudi Schmid upon demonstrating it as the enzyme responsible for catalyzing biotransformation of heme to bilirubin.

Several labs attempted to explain the biotransformation of heme to biliverdin such as Nakajima et al. in 1962 who characterized a soluble "heme α-methenyl oxygenase", however the findings could not be reproduced and alternative non-enzymatic explanations for their observation emerged. The earliest evidence of oxidative enzymatic biotransformation of heme to a bilin was demonstrated by Hans Plieninger and Hans Fischer in 1942. The discovery of HMOX is a unique case of academic lineage as Fischer was the academic adviser for Cecil Watson, and Watson was an adviser for Rudi Schmid.

Felix Hoppe-Seyler coined the name "haemoglobin"; haem being derived from Greek meaning blood, and globin from Latin globus meaning round object (see also: carboxyhemoglobin etymology). Hemoglobin was first discovered in the 1840s by Friedrich Ludwig Hünefeld. Heme (as hemin coordinated with chlorine) was characterized by Ludwik Karol Teichmann in 1853. Many labs investigated in vitro transformation of heme into bilins throughout the 1930s exemplified by the work of Georg Barkan, followed by Esther Killick who recognized a presence of carbon monoxide to correlate with pseudohemoglobin (an obsolete bilin term coined by Barkan) in 1940. The endogenous biotransformation of heme to bilirubin is thought to have been definitively demonstrated with experimental evidence by Irving London in 1950, although trace evidence for the endogenous formation of bilirubin has origins dating back several centuries in the context of jaundice with innumerable global contributions (see also: History of Bilirubin).

CO was detected in exhaled breath 1869. Felix Hoppe-Seyler developed the first qualitative carboxyhemoglobin test, and Josef von Fodor developed the first quantitative analytical test for carboxyhemoglobin. The first reported detection of naturally occurring CO in human blood occurred in 1923 by Royd Ray Sayers et al. although they discarded their data as random error. Alexander Gettler confirmed CO to have a normal presence in blood in 1933, however, he attributed the finding to inevitable pollution exposure or perhaps derived from the human microbiome. Eduard Pflüger detected CO in the intestines of some herbivores. Sjöstrand later demonstrated CO production from hemoglobin decomposition in 1952.
