= Gasotransmitter =

Class of neurotransmitters

Gasotransmitters is a class of neurotransmitters. The molecules are distinguished from other bioactive endogenous gaseous signaling molecules based on a need to meet distinct characterization criteria. Currently, only nitric oxide, carbon monoxide, and hydrogen sulfide are accepted as gasotransmitters. According to in vitro models, gasotransmitters, like other gaseous signaling molecules, may bind to gasoreceptors and trigger signaling in the cells.

The name gasotransmitter is not intended to suggest a gaseous physical state such as infinitesimally small gas bubbles; the physical state is dissolution in complex body fluids and cytosol. These particular gases share many common features in their production and function but carry on their tasks in unique ways which differ from classical signaling molecules.

== Criteria ==
The terminology and characterization criteria of "gasotransmitter" were first introduced in 2002. For one gas molecule to be categorized as a gasotransmitter, all of the following criteria should be met.

1. It is a small molecule of gas;
2. It is freely permeable to membranes. As such, its effects do not rely on the cognate membrane receptors. It can have endocrine, paracrine, and autocrine effects. In their endocrine mode of action, for example, gasotransmitters can enter the blood stream; be carried to remote targets by scavengers and released there, and modulate functions of remote target cells;
3. It is endogenously and enzymatically generated and its production is regulated;
4. It has well defined and specific functions at physiologically relevant concentrations. Thus, manipulating the endogenous levels of this gas evokes specific physiological changes;
5. Functions of this endogenous gas can be mimicked by its exogenously applied counterpart;
6. Its cellular effects may or may not be mediated by second messengers, but should have specific cellular and molecular targets.

== Overview ==
Three candidate gasotransmitters, nitric oxide, carbon monoxide, and hydrogen sulfide, have ironically been discarded as useless toxic gases throughout history. These molecules are a classic example of dose-dependent hormesis such that low-dose is beneficial whereas absence or excessive dosing is toxic.

The three gases have similar features and, in theory, participate in shared signaling pathways, although their actions can either be synergistic or antagonistic. Nitric oxide and hydrogen sulfide are highly reactive with numerous molecular targets, whereas carbon monoxide is relatively stable and metabolically inert predominately limited to interacting with ferrous ion complexes within mammalian organisms. The scope of biological functions are different across biological systems.

Gasotransmitters are under investigation in disciplines such as: biosensing, immunology, neuroscience, gastroenterology, and many other fields to include pharmaceutical development initiatives. While biomedical research has received the most attention, gasotransmitters are under investigation throughout biological systems. Many analytical tools have been developed to study gasotransmitters in vitro.

== Nitric oxide ==
The 1998 Nobel Prize in Physiology or Medicine was awarded for the discovery of nitric oxide (NO) as an endogenous signaling molecule. The research emerged in 1980 when NO was first known as the 'endothelium-derived relaxing factor' (EDRF). The identity of EDRF as actually being NO was revealed in 1986 which many consider to mark the beginning of the modern era of gasotransmitter research.

Relative to carbon monoxide and hydrogen sulfide, NO is exceptional due to the fact it is a radical gas. NO is highly reactive (having a lifetime of a few seconds), yet diffuses freely across membranes. These attributes make NO ideal for a transient paracrine (between adjacent cells) and autocrine (within a single cell) signaling molecule.

It is a known bioproduct in almost all types of organisms, ranging from bacteria to plants, fungi, and animal cells. NO is biosynthesized endogenously from L-arginine by various nitric oxide synthase (NOS) enzymes. Reduction of inorganic nitrate may also serve to make NO. Independent of NOS, an alternative pathway coined the nitrate-nitrite-nitric oxide pathway, elevates NO through the sequential reduction of dietary nitrate derived from plant-based foods such as: leafy greens, such as spinach and arugula, and beetroot. For the human body to generate NO through the nitrate-nitrite-nitric oxide pathway, the reduction of nitrate to nitrite occurs in the mouth by the oral microbiome.

The production of NO is elevated in populations living at high altitudes, which helps these people avoid hypoxia by aiding in pulmonary vasculature vasodilation. The endothelium (inner lining) of blood vessels uses NO to signal the surrounding smooth muscle to relax, thus resulting in vasodilation and increasing blood flow. NO contributes to vessel homeostasis by inhibiting vascular smooth muscle contraction and growth, platelet aggregation, and leukocyte adhesion to the endothelium. Humans with atherosclerosis, diabetes, or hypertension often show impaired NO pathways. In the context of hypertension, the vasodilatory mechanism follows: NO acts through the stimulation of the soluble guanylate cyclase, which is a heterodimeric enzyme with subsequent formation of cyclic-GMP. Cyclic-GMP activates protein kinase G, which causes reuptake of Ca^{2+} and the opening of calcium-activated potassium channels. The fall in concentration of Ca^{2+} ensures that the myosin light-chain kinase (MLCK) can no longer phosphorylate the myosin molecule, thereby stopping the crossbridge cycle and leading to relaxation of the smooth muscle cell.

NO is also generated by phagocytes (monocytes, macrophages, and neutrophils) as part of the human immune response. Phagocytes are armed with inducible nitric oxide synthase (iNOS), which is activated by interferon-gamma (IFN-γ) as a single signal or by tumor necrosis factor (TNF) along with a second signal. On the other hand, transforming growth factor-beta (TGF-β) provides a strong inhibitory signal to iNOS, whereas interleukin-4 (IL-4) and IL-10 provide weak inhibitory signals. In this way, the immune system may regulate the resources of phagocytes that play a role in inflammation and immune responses. NO is secreted as free radicals in an immune response and is toxic to bacteria and intracellular parasites, including Leishmania and malaria; the mechanism for this includes DNA damage and degradation of iron sulfur centers into iron ions and iron-nitrosyl compounds.

Two important biological reaction mechanisms of NO are S-nitrosation of thiols, and nitrosylation of transition metal ions. S-nitrosation involves the (reversible) conversion of thiol groups, including cysteine residues in proteins, to form S-nitrosothiols (RSNOs). S-Nitrosation is a mechanism for dynamic, post-translational regulation of most or all major classes of protein. The second mechanism, nitrosylation, involves the binding of NO to a transition metal ion like iron to modulate the normal enzymatic activity of an enzyme such as cytochrome P450. Nitrosylated ferrous iron is particularly stable, as the binding of the nitrosyl ligand to ferrous iron (Fe(II)) is very strong. Hemoglobin is a prominent example of a heme protein that may be modified by NO by multiple pathways.

There are several mechanisms by which NO has been demonstrated to affect the biology of living cells. These include oxidation of iron-containing proteins such as ribonucleotide reductase and aconitase, activation of the soluble guanylate cyclase, ADP ribosylation of proteins, protein sulfhydryl group nitrosylation, and iron regulatory factor activation. NO has been demonstrated to activate NF-κB in peripheral blood mononuclear cells, an important transcription factor in iNOS gene expression in response to inflammation.

== Carbon monoxide ==
Carbon monoxide (CO) is produced naturally throughout phylogenetic kingdoms. In mammalian physiology, CO is an important neurotransmitter with beneficial roles such as reducing inflammation and blood vessel relaxation. Mammals maintain a baseline carboxyhemoglobin level even if they do not breathe any CO fumes.

In mammals, CO is produced through many enzymatic and non-enzymatic pathways. The most extensively studied source is the catabolic action of heme oxygenase (HMOX) which has been estimated to account for 86% of endogenous CO production. Other contributing sources include: the microbiome, cytochrome P450 reductase, human acireductone dioxygenase, tyrosinase, lipid peroxidation, alpha-keto acids, and other oxidative mechanisms. Similarly, the velocity and catalytic activity of HMOX can be enhanced by a plethora of dietary substances and xenobiotics to increase CO production.

The biomedical study of CO traces back to factitious airs in the 1790s when Thomas Beddoes, James Watt, James Lind, and many others investigated beneficial effects of hydrocarbonate (water gas) inhalation. Following Solomon Snyder's first report that CO is a normal neurotransmitter in 1993, CO has received significant clinical attention as a biological regulator. Unlike NO and H_{2}S, CO is an inert molecule with remarkable chemical stability capable of diffusing through membranes to exert its effects locally and in distant tissues. CO has been shown to interact with molecular targets including soluble guanylyl cyclase, mitochondrial oxidases, catalase, nitric oxide synthase, mitogen-activated protein kinase, PPAR gamma, HIF1A, NRF2, ion channels, cystathionine beta synthase, and numerous other functionalities. It is widely accepted that CO primarily exerts its effects in mammals primarily through interacting with ferrous ion complexes such as the prosthetic heme moiety of hemoproteins. Aside from Fe^{2+} interactions, CO may also interact with zinc within metalloproteinases, non-metallic histidine residues of certain ion channels, and various other metallic targets such nickel and molybdenum.

== Hydrogen sulfide ==
Hydrogen sulfide (H_{2}S) has important signaling functions in mammalian physiology. The gas is produced enzymatically by cystathionine beta-synthase and cystathionine gamma-lyase, endogenous non-enzymatic reactions, and may also be produced by the microbiome. Eventually the gas is converted to sulfite in the mitochondria by thiosulfate reductase, and the sulfite is further oxidized to thiosulfate and sulfate by sulfite oxidase. The sulfates are excreted in the urine.

H_{2}S acts as a relaxant of smooth muscle and as a vasodilator. Though both NO and H_{2}S have been shown to relax blood vessels, their mechanisms of action are different: while NO activates the enzyme guanylyl cyclase, H_{2}S activates ATP-sensitive potassium channels in smooth muscle cells. Researchers are not clear how the vessel-relaxing responsibilities are shared between NO and H_{2}S. However, there exists some evidence to suggest that NO does most of the vessel-relaxing work in large vessels and H_{2}S is responsible for similar action in smaller blood vessels. H_{2}S deficiency can be detrimental to the vascular function after an acute myocardial infarction (AMI). H_{2}S therapy reduces myocardial injury and reperfusion complications. Due to its effects similar to NO (without its potential to form peroxides by interacting with superoxide), H_{2}S is now recognized as potentially protecting against cardiovascular disease.

Recent findings suggest strong cellular crosstalk of NO and H_{2}S, demonstrating that the vasodilatatory effects of these two gases are mutually dependent. Additionally, H_{2}S reacts with intracellular S-nitrosothiols to form the smallest S-nitrosothiol (HSNO), and a role of H_{2}S in controlling the intracellular S-nitrosothiol pool has been suggested.

== Gasotransmitter candidates ==
Some gaseous signaling molecules may be a gasotransmitter, notably methane and cyanide. There is ongoing controversy about the strict criteria for gasotransmitters. Some researchers have proposed use of the term small molecule signaling agent, while others have proposed to relax the criteria to include other gases, such as oxygen as an essential gasotransmitter, similar to that of essential amino acids.
