= 2-Hydroxy-3-keto-5-thiomethylpent-1-ene dioxygenase =

2-Hydroxy-3-keto-5-thiomethylpent-1-ene dioxygenase may refer to:

- Acireductone dioxygenase (iron(II)-requiring), an enzyme
- Acireductone dioxygenase (Ni2+-requiring), an enzyme
