= Ethyl levulinate =

Names
- Preferred IUPAC name Ethyl 4-oxopentanoate
- Other names Ethyl levulate Ethyl laevulinate Ethyl 4-ketovalerate Ethyl 3-acetylpropionate Ethyl 4-oxovalerate Ethyl ketovalerate

Identifiers
CAS Number	539-88-8
3D model (JSmol)	Interactive image
ChEMBL	ChEMBL1235931
ChemSpider	13853514
ECHA InfoCard	100.007.936
EC Number	208-728-2
PubChem CID	10883
UNII	7BU24CSS2G
CompTox Dashboard (EPA)	DTXSID8047058
- InChI: InChI=1S/C7H12O3/c1-3-10-7(9)5-4-6(2)8/h3-5H2,1-2H3 Key: GMEONFUTDYJSNV-UHFFFAOYSA-N; InChI=1S/C7H12O3/c1-3-10-7(9)5-4-6(2)8/h3-5H2,1-2H3 Key: GMEONFUTDYJSNV-UHFFFAOYSA-N
- SMILES: CCOC(=O)CCC(=O)C

Properties
Chemical formula	C_{7}H_{12}O_{3}
Molar mass	144.170 g·mol^{−1}
Density	1.016 g/cm^{3}
Melting point	−60 °C (−76 °F; 213 K)
Boiling point	203 to 205 °C (397 to 401 °F; 476 to 478 K)
- Except where otherwise noted, data are given for materials in their standard state (at 25 °C [77 °F], 100 kPa). verify (what is ?) Infobox references

Ethyl levulinate is an organic compound with the formula CH_{3}C(O)CH_{2}CH_{2}C(O)OC_{2}H_{5}. It is an ester derived from the keto acid levulinic acid. Ethyl levulinate can also be obtained by reaction between ethanol and furfuryl alcohol. These two synthesis options make ethyl levulinate a viable biofuel option, since both precursors can be obtained from biomass: levulinic acid from 6-carbon polymerized sugars such as cellulose, and furfural from 5-carbon polymerized sugars such as xylan and arabinan.
