= Esther Killick =

British physiologist

Esther Margaret Killick
- Esther Killick, undated
- Born: 3 May 1902; Ilford, England
- Died: 31 May 1960 (aged 58); London, England
- Education: Leeds Girls' High School; University of Leeds
- Known for: Physiology, carbon monoxide
- Scientific career
- Fields: Physiology
- Workplaces: University of Leeds; University of Birmingham; London School of Hygiene & Tropical Medicine; London School of Medicine for Women; Johns Hopkins School of Medicine

Esther Margaret Killick (3 May 1902 – 31 May 1960) was an English physiologist who was a professor of physiology at the London School of Medicine for Women (Royal Free Hospital School of Medicine) from 1941 until her death in 1960. Her main research interests lay in respiratory physiology and carbon monoxide poisoning.

== Early life and education ==
Killick was born on 3 May 1902 in Ilford to Arthur Killick and Henrietta Fanny (née Moulton). She attended Leeds Girls' High School and went on to study at the University of Leeds, earning a BSc with honours in physiology followed by an MB ChB in 1929. She later received an MSc (1937) and DSc (1952) from Leeds.

== Career ==
Killick worked in the physiology department of the University of Leeds from 1929 to 1931, as an investigator to the Safety in Mines Research Board. During this period she studied carbon monoxide poisoning and acclimatisation, and collaborated with John Scott Haldane from the University of Birmingham. In 1935, she was appointed lecturer in industrial medicine at the University of Birmingham. Killick moved to London in 1939 with an appointment as lecturer in applied physiology at the London School of Hygiene & Tropical Medicine. In 1941, she was appointed to the Sophia Jex-Blake chair of physiology London School of Medicine for Women (renamed the Royal Free Hospital School of Medicine in 1947), where she spent the remainder of her career. She held a visiting professorship at the Johns Hopkins School of Medicine in 1953.

Killick sat on numerous committees, including the Medical Research Council's industrial research board, the National Coal Board's physiological panel, the European Coal and Steel Community's committee on medical research on carbon monoxide poisoning, and the Physiological Society committee. She was a member of numerous boards for the University of London, and oversaw the establishment of the pre-clinical departments of the university's overseas colleges, University College Ibadan (now the University of Ibadan) and University College of the West Indies (now the University of the West Indies).

=== Research ===
Killick began investigating respiratory physiology and carbon monoxide poisoning in her first role at Leeds, and this was her primary research interest throughout the rest of her career. In Birmingham, she conducted a series of experiments in which she "gassed herself for science" (as reported by the Birmingham Gazette in 1941) by exposing herself to carbon monoxide in a sealed box at weekly intervals, causing herself to become hypoxic and sometimes lose consciousness. She did, however, demonstrate acclimatisation over time, with her symptoms and blood carbon monoxide levels decreasing with successive sessions over a period of many months. She reported her findings in articles published in 1936 and 1948. She was the first to show that humans and mice acclimatise to carbon monoxide differently due to differences in the respiratory epithelium. Later in her career, she investigated treatments for carbon monoxide poisoning, using different gases to ventilate dogs that were unconscious due to excess carbon monoxide; she showed that a mix of 95% oxygen and 5% carbon dioxide was more effective than air or pure oxygen.

As carbon monoxide is now understood to be a neurotransmitter (see carbon monoxide-releasing molecules and heme oxygenase), Killick made pioneering discoveries pertaining to physiological roles upon recognizing a vasodilatory effect of carbon monoxide on a feline pulmonary arterial vessel in 1951. Similarly, in 1940 Killick recognized heme degradation products (pseudohemoglobin) correlate with continued presence of carbon monoxide in the blood of patients recovering from carbon monoxide poisoning, the observation is a trace origin for endogenous carbon monoxide produced via catabolism of heme by heme oxygenase.

== Personal life ==
Killick married Arthur St George Huggett, a physiologist, in 1938. They had two daughters, Margaret (b. 1945) and Jean (b. 1940). She died in London's National Hospital for Neurology and Neurosurgery on 31 May 1960, aged 58, from a cerebral haemorrhage.

A photograph of Killick by Elliott & Fry is held in the collection of the National Portrait Gallery.
