= Asparagine—oxo-acid transaminase =

asparagine-oxo-acid transaminase

Identifiers
- EC no.: 2.6.1.14
- CAS no.: 9030-43-7

Databases
- IntEnz: IntEnz view
- BRENDA: BRENDA entry
- ExPASy: NiceZyme view
- KEGG: KEGG entry
- MetaCyc: metabolic pathway
- PRIAM: profile
- PDB structures: RCSB PDB PDBe PDBsum
- Gene Ontology: AmiGO / QuickGO
Search
- PMC: articles
- PubMed: articles
- NCBI: proteins

In enzymology, an asparagine-oxo-acid transaminase (EC 2.6.1.14) is an enzyme that catalyzes the chemical reaction

L-asparagine + a 2-oxo acid $\rightleftharpoons$ 2-oxosuccinamate + an amino acid

Thus, the two substrates of this enzyme are L-asparagine and 2-oxo acid, whereas its two products are 2-oxosuccinamate and amino acid.

This enzyme belongs to the family of transferases, specifically the transaminases, which transfer nitrogenous groups. The systematic name of this enzyme class is L-asparagine:2-oxo-acid aminotransferase. This enzyme is also called asparagine-keto acid aminotransferase. This enzyme participates in alanine and aspartate metabolism and tetracycline biosynthesis. It employs one cofactor, pyridoxal phosphate.
