= Nitric Oxide (journal) =

- Discipline: Nitric oxide
- Language: English
- Edited by: Miriam M. Cortese-Krott

Publication details
- History: 1997-present
- Publisher: Elsevier
- Frequency: 8/year
- Impact factor: 4.898 (2021)

Standard abbreviations
- ISO 4: Nitric Oxide

Indexing
- CODEN: NIOXF5
- ISSN: 1089-8603 (print); 1089-8611 (web)
- LCCN: 97660095
- OCLC no.: 35147437

Links
- Journal homepage; Online access

Nitric Oxide is a peer-reviewed scientific journal and official journal of the Nitric Oxide Society. The journal covers the broad field of nitric oxide and other similar gaseous signaling molecules such as hydrogen sulfide and carbon monoxide. Published research includes basic and clinical topics such as cell biology, molecular biology, biochemistry, immunology, pathology, genetics, physiology, pharmacology, and disease processes.

== Abstracting and indexing ==
The journal is abstracted and indexed in EMBASE, EMBiology, and Scopus. According to the Journal Citation Reports, the journal has a 2021 impact factor of 4.898.
