= D-methionine—pyruvate transaminase =

Enzyme of the aminotransferase category

Identifiers
- EC no.: 2.6.1.41
- CAS no.: 37277-93-3

Databases
- IntEnz: IntEnz view
- BRENDA: BRENDA entry
- ExPASy: NiceZyme view
- KEGG: KEGG entry
- MetaCyc: metabolic pathway
- PRIAM: profile
- PDB structures: RCSB PDB PDBe PDBsum
- Gene Ontology: AmiGO / QuickGO
Search
- PMC: articles
- PubMed: articles
- NCBI: proteins

D-methionine—pyruvate transaminase (EC 2.6.1.41) is an enzyme that catalyzes the chemical reaction

D-methionine
+
pyruvic acid
4-(methylthio)-2-oxobutanoic acid
+
alanine

The two substrates of this enzyme characterised from cauliflower florets are D-methionine and pyruvic acid. Its two products are 4-(methylthio)-2-oxobutanoic acid and L-alanine. The product keto acid goes on to form ethylene.

This enzyme belongs to the family of transferases, specifically the transaminases, which transfer nitrogenous groups. The systematic name of this enzyme is D-methionine:pyruvate aminotransferase. Other names in common use include D-methionine transaminase, and D-methionine aminotransferase.
