= Pseudoacid =

Cyclic oxocarboxylic acid

A pseudoacid in organic chemistry is a cyclic oxocarboxylic acid. Most commonly, these form from aldehyde and keto carboxylic acids, and the cyclic forms are furanoid (5-membered ring with oxygen) or pyranoid (6-membered ring with oxygen). The original pseudoacid to be described as such (using the German Pseudosäuren) was levulinic acid (4-oxopentanoic acid).

Unlike the parent (open-form) oxocarboxylic acid, the pseudoacid has a chiral center.

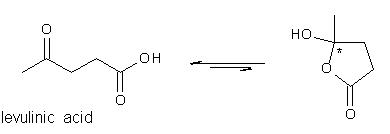
Levulinic acid open-cyclic interconversion

The position of equilibrium in oxocarboxylic acids, toward the open form or the cyclic (pseuodacid) form, is influenced by a number of factors. In aliphatic 4- and 5-oxocarboxylic acids, intervening substituents assists in ring closure. Alkenes with the interacting groups substituted cis to each other also assists in ring closure. Aryl systems with the interacting groups substituted ortho to each other assists in ring closure. Other factors such as the gem-dialkyl effect (Thorpe–Ingold effect), electronic influences, and steric compression can also influence the open-cyclic equilibrium.

Like carboxylic acids, pseudoacids have "pseudoacyl" derivatives. These include pseudoacyl halides, pseudoesters, endocyclic and exocyclic-N pseudoamides, and pseudoanhydrides. Like aldehydes and ketones, pseudoacids have "pseudocarbonyl" derivatives also.
