= Gas sensor protein =

A gas sensor protein is a type of protein that detects and responds to specific gaseous signaling molecules, playing a role in various biological processes and environmental sensing mechanisms.

Protein-based gasoreceptors are generally found in the cytoplasm of cells. They act in cell signaling by receiving (binding to) gaseous signaling molecules or gasotransmitters. They are specialized proteins that allow communication within and between cells. Gas-sensing gasoreceptors has been identified for ethylene in plants, nitric oxide in mammals, carbon monoxide, and oxygen in microorganisms. In the process of signal transduction, gaseous solute binding affects a cascading chemical change through the cell. Whether gasoreceptors exist for gases such as hydrogen sulfide and methane is still under investigation. All gasoreceptors seem to require either metal cofactor or ions to bind to gas. Example includes the requirement of copper ion in ethylene gasoreceptor and heme cofactor in NO gasoreceptor soluble guanylyl cyclase.

== History ==
Below is a brief selection of key events in the history of gas sensing research.

- 1990s – Dos and FixL were discovered as oxygen sensor in bacteria E. coli and R. meliloti respectively. CooA and RcoM was discovered as carbon monoxide sensor in Rhodospirillum rubrum and Burkholderia xenovorans respectively. Soluble guanylyl cyclase was discovered as nitric oxide sensor in mammals. Ethylene receptor ETR1 was identified in Arabidopsis.

== See also ==
- Soluble guanylyl cyclase
