= Arthur St George Huggett =

British physiologist (1897–1968)

Hugo Huggett
- Born: 23 April 1897; North Kensington, London, England
- Died: 21 July 1968 (aged 71); Edinburgh, Scotland
- Education: University of London
- Scientific career
- Institutions: St Mary's Hospital, London

Arthur St George Joseph McCarthy Huggett FRS FRSE (23 April 1897 – 21 July 1968) was a British physiologist.

== Life ==
He was born in North Kensington in London, the son of Arthur Henry Richard Huggett ( a lecturer in botany at Goldsmiths College) and his wife, Helen Mary McCarthy, an active Suffragette of Irish descent. He was raised as a Roman Catholic but later denounced his faith. He was educated by a private governess until 12 years old then at Wimbledon College then studied medicine at the University of London.

His training was interrupted by the First World War during which he served 1918 to 1919 with the Royal Army Medical Corps in Murmansk, supporting British troops in the ill-judged invasion of Russia after the German surrender. Returning to London he graduated BSc in 1920 and MB in 1921.

From 1919 he acted as a Demonstrator in the Physiology lectures at St Thomas's Hospital in London. In 1925 he received his first doctorate (PhD) and a second (DSc) in 1930 at which point he was promoted to Lecturer. He was given a full professorship at St Marys Hospital Medical School in 1935 where he then worked until retiral in 1964. He was elected a Fellow of the Royal Society of London in 1958 and a fellow of the Royal Society of Edinburgh in 1965. His proposers for the latter were Robert Campbell Garry, Norman Davidson, Hamish Munro and Paul Bacsich .

He retired to Edinburgh and died there on 21 July 1968.

== Family ==
He married three times: firstly in 1923 to Margaret Mary Head (d.1934); secondly in 1938 to Esther Margaret Killick (d.1960); and lastly in 1962 to the eminent botanist Helen Kemp Porter (d.1987), then a widow.
