= HMOX2 =

Protein-coding gene in humans

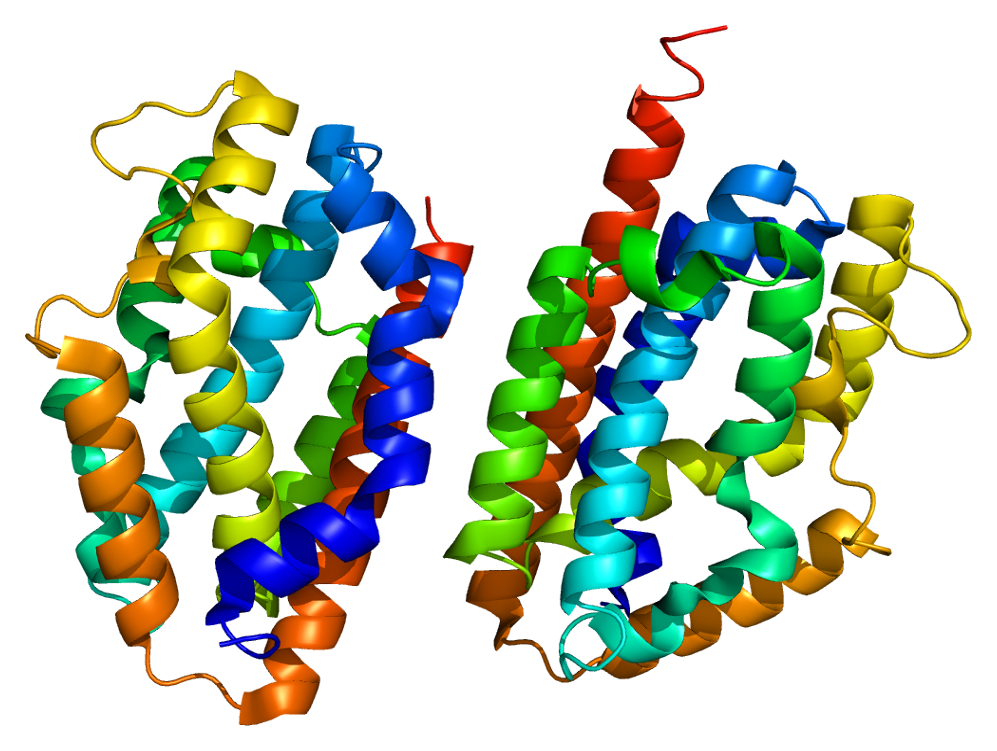

Identifiers
- Aliases: HMOX2, HO-2, heme oxygenase 2
- External IDs: OMIM: 141251; MGI: 109373; GeneCards: HMOX2
Available structures
PDB	Ortholog search: PDBe RCSB
PDB	List of PDB id codes 2Q32, 2QPP, 2RGZ, 4WMH
Enzyme activity
EC #	BRENDA	ExPASy	KEGG	MetaCyc
1.14.14.18	↗	↗	↗	↗

Gene location (Human)
Chr.	Chromosome 16 (human)
Band	16p13.3	Start	4,474,690 bp
Band	16p13.3	End	4,510,347 bp

Gene location (Mouse)
Chr.	Chromosome 16 (mouse)
Band	16 A1|16 2.46 cM	Start	4,544,225 bp
Band	16 A1|16 2.46 cM	End	4,584,606 bp
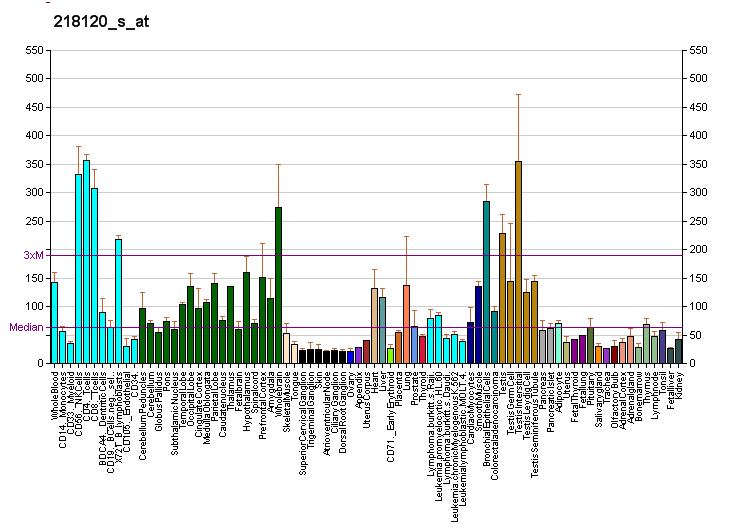

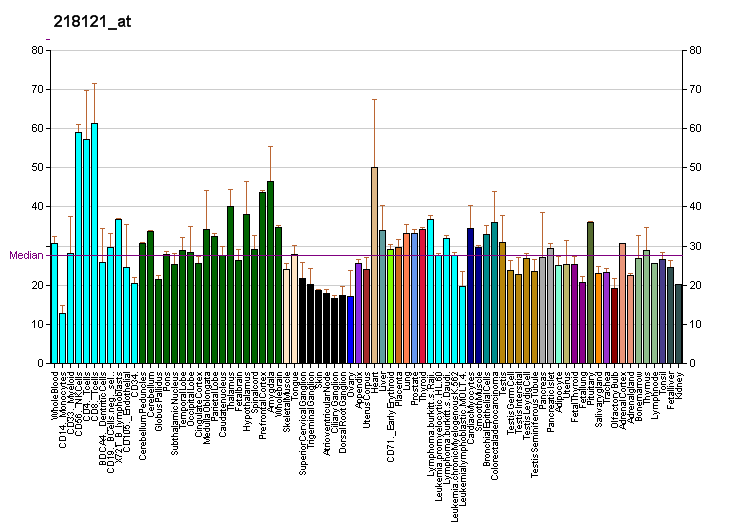
RNA expression pattern
Bgee	Human / Mouse (ortholog); Top expressed in: right testis; left testis; prefrontal cortex; left ventricle; apex of heart; superior frontal gyrus; Brodmann area 9; right auricle of heart; nucleus accumbens; body of stomach / Top expressed in: spermatid; seminiferous tubule; facial motor nucleus; anterior horn of spinal cord; dentate gyrus of hippocampal formation granule cell; supraoptic nucleus; stroma of bone marrow; endothelial cell of lymphatic vessel; external carotid artery; internal carotid artery; More reference expression data
BioGPS	More reference expression data
Gene ontology
Molecular function	oxidoreductase activity; protein binding; metal ion binding; heme oxygenase (decyclizing) activity; heme binding
Cellular component	intracellular membrane-bounded organelle; endoplasmic reticulum membrane; membrane; endoplasmic reticulum; plasma membrane; specific granule membrane
Biological process	response to hypoxia; cellular iron ion homeostasis; heme oxidation; response to oxidative stress; heme catabolic process; neutrophil degranulation; iron ion homeostasis
Sources:Amigo / QuickGO
Orthologs
Databases	NCBI: entry; OMA: entry
Species	Human	Mouse
Entrez	3163	15369
Ensembl	ENSG00000277424; ENSG00000103415	ENSMUSG00000004070
UniProt	P30519	O70252
RefSeq (mRNA)	NM_001127204; NM_001127205; NM_001127206; NM_001286267; NM_001286268 NM_001286269; NM_001286270; NM_001286271; NM_002134	NM_001136066; NM_010443; NM_001357050; NM_001378999
RefSeq (protein)	NP_001120676; NP_001120677; NP_001120678; NP_001273196; NP_001273197 NP_001273198; NP_001273199; NP_001273200; NP_002125	NP_001129538; NP_034573; NP_001343979; NP_001365928
Location (UCSC)	Chr 16: 4.47 – 4.51 Mb	Chr 16: 4.54 – 4.58 Mb
PubMed search
- Wikidata
View/Edit Human	View/Edit Mouse

Heme oxygenase 2 is an enzyme that in humans is encoded by the HMOX2 gene.

== Function ==
Heme oxygenase, an essential enzyme in heme catabolism, cleaves heme to form biliverdin, which is subsequently converted to bilirubin by biliverdin reductase, and carbon monoxide, a putative neurotransmitter. Heme oxygenase activity is induced by its substrate heme and by various nonheme substances. Heme oxygenase occurs as 2 isozymes, an inducible heme oxygenase-1 and a constitutive heme oxygenase-2. HMOX1 and HMOX2 (this enzyme) belong to the heme oxygenase family.
