= Acireductone dioxygenase =

Acireductone dioxygenase may refer to:

- Acireductone dioxygenase (iron(II)-requiring), an enzyme
- Acireductone dioxygenase (Ni2+-requiring), an enzyme
