= Levulinic acid =

- Skeletal formula

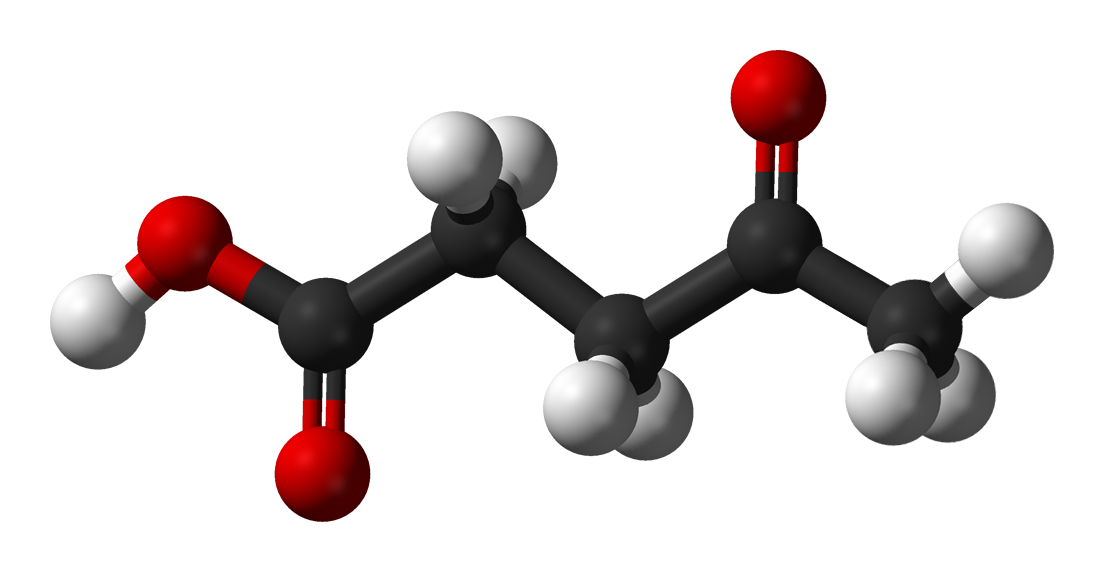
- Ball-and-stick model

Names
- Preferred IUPAC name 4-Oxopentanoic acid
- Other names Levulinic acid, β-Acetylpropionic acid, 3-Acetopropionic acid, β-acetylpropionic acid, γ-ketovaleric acid

Identifiers
CAS Number	123-76-2
3D model (JSmol)	Interactive image
ChEBI	CHEBI:45630
ChEMBL	ChEMBL1235931
ChemSpider	11091
DrugBank	DB02239
ECHA InfoCard	100.004.228
PubChem CID	11579
UNII	RYX5QG61EI
CompTox Dashboard (EPA)	DTXSID8021648
- InChI: InChI=1S/C5H8O3/c1-4(6)2-3-5(7)8/h2-3H2,1H3,(H,7,8) Key: JOOXCMJARBKPKM-UHFFFAOYSA-N; InChI=1/C5H8O3/c1-4(6)2-3-5(7)8/h2-3H2,1H3,(H,7,8) Key: JOOXCMJARBKPKM-UHFFFAOYAR
- SMILES: CC(=O)CCC(=O)O

Properties
Chemical formula	C_{5}H_{8}O_{3}
Molar mass	116.11 g/mol
Density	1.1447 g/cm^{3}
Melting point	33 to 35 °C (91 to 95 °F; 306 to 308 K)
Boiling point	245 to 246 °C (473 to 475 °F; 518 to 519 K)

Hazards
- GHS labelling
Pictograms	(GHS05: Corrosive) (GHS07: Exclamation mark)
Signal word	Danger
Hazard statements	H302, H315, H317, H318, H319
Precautionary statements	P261, P264, P264+P265, P270, P272, P280, P301+P317, P302+P352, P305+P351+P338, P305+P354+P338, P317, P321, P330, P333+P317, P337+P317, P362+P364, P501
- Lethal dose or concentration (LD, LC)
LD_{50} (median dose)	1850 mg/kg
- Except where otherwise noted, data are given for materials in their standard state (at 25 °C [77 °F], 100 kPa). verify (what is ?) Infobox references

Levulinic acid, or 4-oxopentanoic acid, is an organic compound with the formula CH_{3}C(O)CH_{2}CH_{2}CO_{2}H. It is classified as a keto acid. This white crystalline solid is soluble in water and polar organic solvents. It is derived from degradation of cellulose and is a potential precursor to biofuels, such as ethyl levulinate.

== Synthesis ==
Levulinic acid was first prepared in 1840 by Dutch chemist Gerardus Johannes Mulder by heating fructose with hydrochloric acid. The first commercial production of levulinic acid began as a batchwise process in an autoclave by starch manufacturer A. E. Staley in the 1940s. In 1953 Quaker Oats developed a continuous process for the production of levulinic acid. In 1956 it was identified as a platform chemical with high potential. and in 2004 the US Department of Energy (U.S. DoE) identified levulinic acid as one of the 12 potential platform chemicals in the biorefinery concept.

The synthesis of levulinic acid from hexoses (glucose, fructose) or starch in dilute hydrochloric acid or sulfuric acid. In addition to formic acid further, partly insoluble, by-products are produced. These are deeply colored and their complete removal is a challenge for most technologies.

Many concepts for the commercial production of levulinic acid are based on a strong acid technology. The processes are conducted in a continuous manner at high pressures and temperatures. Lignocellulose is an inexpensive starting material. Levulinic acid is separated from the mineral acid catalyst by extraction. Levulinic acid is purified by distillation.

== Reactions and applications ==
Levulinic acid is used as a precursor for pharmaceuticals, plasticizers, and various other additives. The largest application of levulinic acid is its use in the production of aminolevulinic acid, a biodegradable herbicide used in South Asia. Another key application is the use of levulinic acid in cosmetics. Ethyl levulinate, a primary derivative of levulinic acid, is extensively used in fragrances and perfumes. Levulinic acid is a chemical building block or starting material for a wide variety of other compounds including γ-valerolactone and 2-methyl-THF.

=== Other occurrence and niche uses ===
Levulinic acid is used in cigarettes to increase nicotine delivery in smoke and binding of nicotine to neural receptors.

Levulinic acid, in its cyclic alternate structure, was the first pseudoacid to be described as such.

== Etymology ==
The former term "levulose" for fructose gave levulinic acid its name.
