= Helen Porter =

British botanist (1899-1987)

Professor Helen Porter FRS FRSE
- Born: Helen Kemp Archbold; 10 November 1899; Farnham, Surrey, England
- Died: 7 December 1987 (aged 88)
- Education: Bedford College, University of London and Imperial College London
- Known for: Studies of polysaccharide metabolism in plants
- Scientific career
- Fields: Biology, botany
- Workplaces: Imperial College London
- Thesis: (1932)

Helen Kemp Porter (née Archbold, later Huggett; 10 November 1899 – 7 December 1987) was a British botanist from Imperial College London. She was a Fellow of the Royal Society and the first woman to be appointed as a professor at Imperial College London. Her studies of polysaccharide metabolism in tobacco plants were groundbreaking; she was one of the first British scientists to use the innovative technologies of chromatography and radioactive tracers.

== Personal life ==
Porter was born at Place Hale in the town of Farnham, Surrey. Her father, George Kemp Archbold, was the headmaster of a school and her mother, Caroline Emily Broughton Whitehead, was a Belgian-trained professional singer. The Archbold family moved to Bristol in 1901, when Porter was two years old. She was educated at home during her early years in a conservative Victorian environment, acquiring skill in reading and writing French and English. She had one older sister. Porter's childhood was disrupted by the beginning of World War I, prompting the family to split up; her mother moved to London to work in the government run National Kitchens and her father moved to Yorkshire to work at a different school. Porter and her sister stayed in Bristol to continue attending the Clifton High School for Girls. In her early years, she travelled extensively, canoeing the Danube River in the 1920s and making several trips to Middle Eastern archaeological sites. Porter married William George Porter, a physician, in 1937. After a few years of marriage, William Porter died; however, Helen Porter kept his last name for professional purposes. She remarried in 1962, to Prof Arthur St George Huggett FRS FRSE, a professor of physiology with two children; he died in 1968. Throughout her life, Porter maintained a passion for needlework; her works were often based on imagery culled from contemporary scientific publications. She died in 1987 at the age of 88.

== Education ==
After her early home education, Porter matriculated at Clifton High School for Girls in 1906, at six years old. She graduated from the school in 1917 with high achievement in all subjects. At thirteen, she became interested in the sciences thanks to an influential teacher. She matriculated at Bedford College, the women's college of London University, where she studied chemistry, physics, and mathematics and earned degrees in physics and chemistry, both with honours. Porter then earned her D.Sc. from London University in 1932 and received a diploma from Imperial College London. To bolster her later work in biology and biochemistry, Porter attended Birkbeck College and Chelsea Polytechnical College.

== Scientific career ==
Porter continued her studies at Imperial College London as a postgraduate student; she worked in the organic chemistry laboratory run by Professor Thorpe under Dr. Martha Whiteley. Her work in Thorpe's lab involved derivatives of various barbiturates. In 1922, she joined a research group at the Low Temperature Research Station associated with Cambridge University to study the deterioration of apples in cold storage, a problem plaguing importers of the fruit. Porter's research team examined the fruit's respiration and analysed their organic compounds, specifically their sugars, organic acids, starches, hemicelluloses, and pectins. Porter's study expanded from simple chemical analysis to examining the role of these chemicals in the development and maturation of the fruit; she also researched their transport, synthesis, and metabolism. By 1931, Porter and her team had successfully understood the chemical reactions in stored apples but had not yet ascertained their cause; that year, the study's funding was cut off and their research was concluded.

After her studies of apples ended in 1931, Porter was hired as a Visiting Lecturer in Biochemistry at Swanley Horticultural College. Porter also began work with the Research Institute of Plant Physiology at Imperial College and the Rothamstead Experimental Laboratories. Her research there included carbohydrate metabolism in monocotyledons, especially barley, and its relationship with the plant's mineral nutrition. She studied the location of synthesis for starches found in the grain itself, and debunked the popular opinion that carbohydrates were synthesised and stored in the plant's stem, then transported to the grain, where they were converted to starch. Instead, Porter and her research group found that the carbohydrates in the plant's stem were used for energy late in its life cycle; the starch was actually synthesised directly in the grain.

When World War II began, Porter moved to the Rothamstead laboratories because of Imperial College's new focus on the war effort. In 1947, she moved to St. Louis in the United States for a year to research at the laboratory of Nobel-winning biologists Carl Ferdinand Cori and Gerty Cori. There, she studied the role of enzymes in starch synthesis and decomposition and how to use enzymes in experiments on glycogen metabolism. She studied the breakdown of starch in 1948 and 1949 after she returned to London. That year, Porter spent six months at Bangor University, where she discovered that the enzyme starch phosphorylase is present in barley.

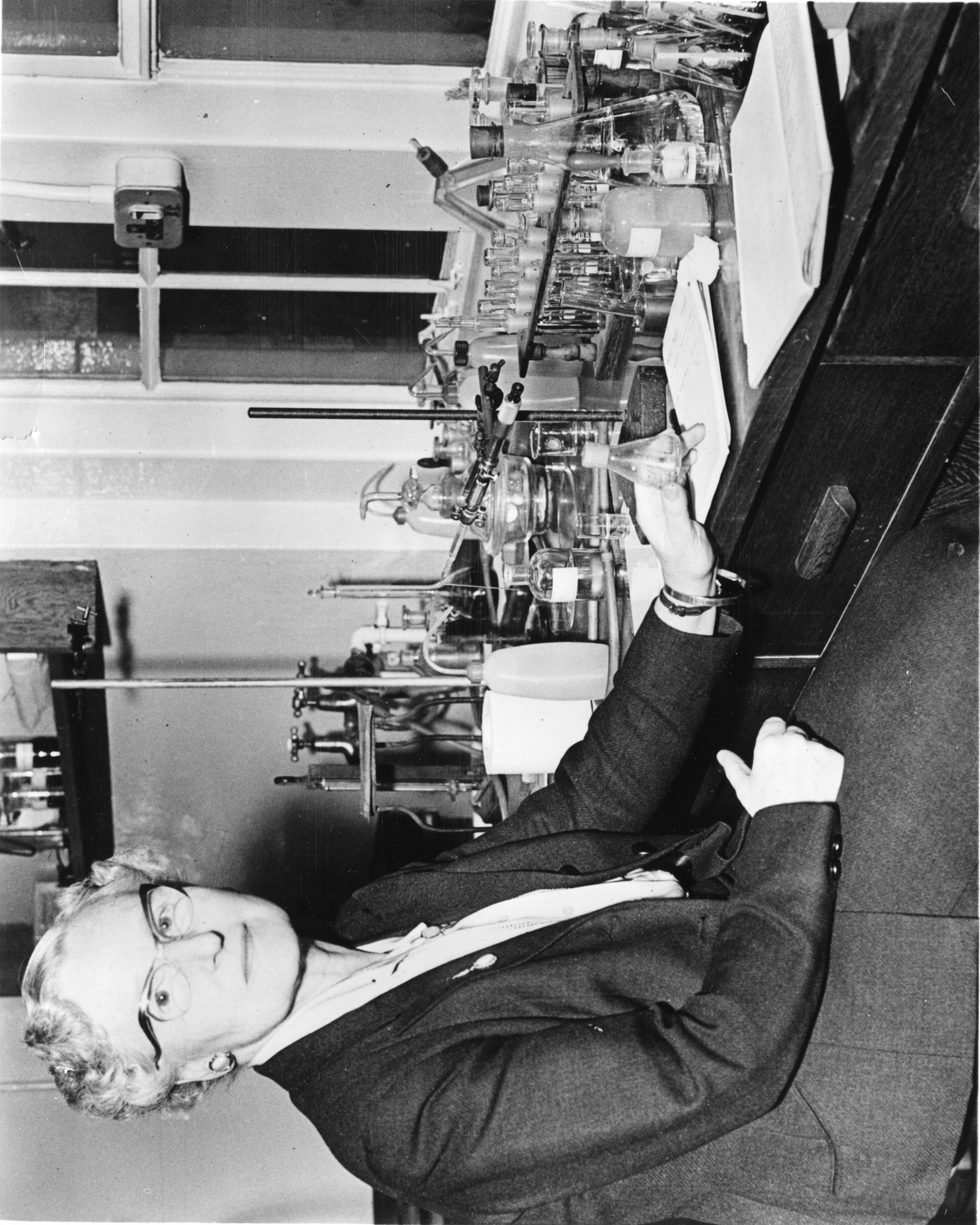
Helen Kemp Archbold Porter in laboratory

In 1953, Porter became head of her own research group at Imperial College, thanks to a grant from the Nuffield Foundation. Her group used the then-innovative techniques of chromatography and radioactive labels to further study plants' metabolic pathways. She synthesised radioactive starches and glucose and used them in experiments that analysed the movement of photosynthetic metabolites and the process of starch and fructosan formation, one of the first scientists to do so in Britain. Unlike her earlier experiments, this research was conducted on tobacco plants. The new techniques, combined with autoradiography, allowed her to study these processes in living cells and tissue. In 1956, primarily due to this research, she was elected a Fellow of the Royal Society. The next year, Porter was promoted to the position of Principal Scientific Officer of the Institute of Plant Physiology and was appointed Reader of Enzymology in the Botany Department. In 1959, she became the department head of Imperial College's Department of Plant Physiology, as well as the college's first appointment of a woman as a professor.

Because of her credentials in biochemistry, Porter was elected to the Committee of the Biochemical Society in 1962. Porter retired from her position as department head in 1964, the same year that she spearheaded the creation of specialised task forces in the Society and became Second Secretary to the College's Agricultural Research Council. She was also appointed as an honorary member of the Agricultural Research Council Society. The next year, she was appointed Chairman of the Biochemical Society. As chair, she innovated the subscription policies and the journal publication policies; the changes she implemented influence the Society today. Porter was honoured in 1966 by being appointed as a Fellow of the Imperial College of Science and Technology. In 1972, she was appointed as adviser to the secretary of the Agricultural Research Council. Throughout her extensive career, Porter authored or coauthored 39 papers in various journals.
