= Cecil Watson =

American hepatologist (1901–1983)

Cecil James Watson
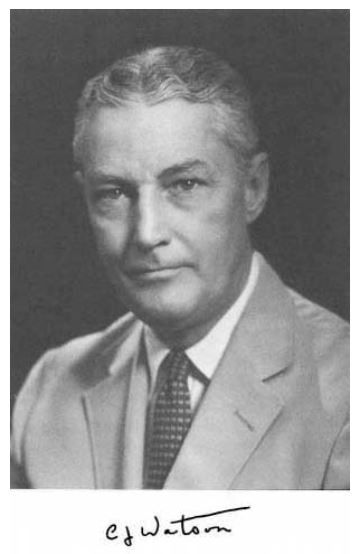
- Born: May 31, 1901; Minneapolis, Minnesota, U.S.
- Died: April 11, 1983 (aged 81)
- Scientific career
- Academic advisors: Hans Fischer
- Doctoral students: Rudi Schmid

Cecil James Watson (May 31, 1901 – April 11, 1983) was an American hepatologist.

Watson was born in Minneapolis to Irish immigrant parents. His father was a doctor and received university education in Canada.

The younger Watson enrolled at the University of Minnesota in 1919 to study French, English, and writing. In 1921, Watson began medical studies at the University of Michigan, and transferred to the University of Minnesota Medical School the next year, where he completed his degrees. He earned a doctor of medicine and Master of Science degree, followed by a doctorate in pathology in 1928.

Watson started his medical career at a clinic in Minot, North Dakota before moving to Germany in 1930 to work with Hans Fischer. Upon his return to the United States in 1932, Watson began working at Minneapolis General Hospital. By 1934, Watson was assistant professor of medicine at UM. Watson lead the medical school as chairman from 1943 to 1966, stepping down for a position at Northwestern Hospital.

Watson was named a member of the National Academy of Sciences in 1959, and the Cecil J. Watson Award was inaugurated in his honor by the Minneapolis Society of Internal Medicine in 1961.

Watson died on April 11, 1983, aged 82.
