= HMOX1 =

Mammalian protein found in Homo sapiens

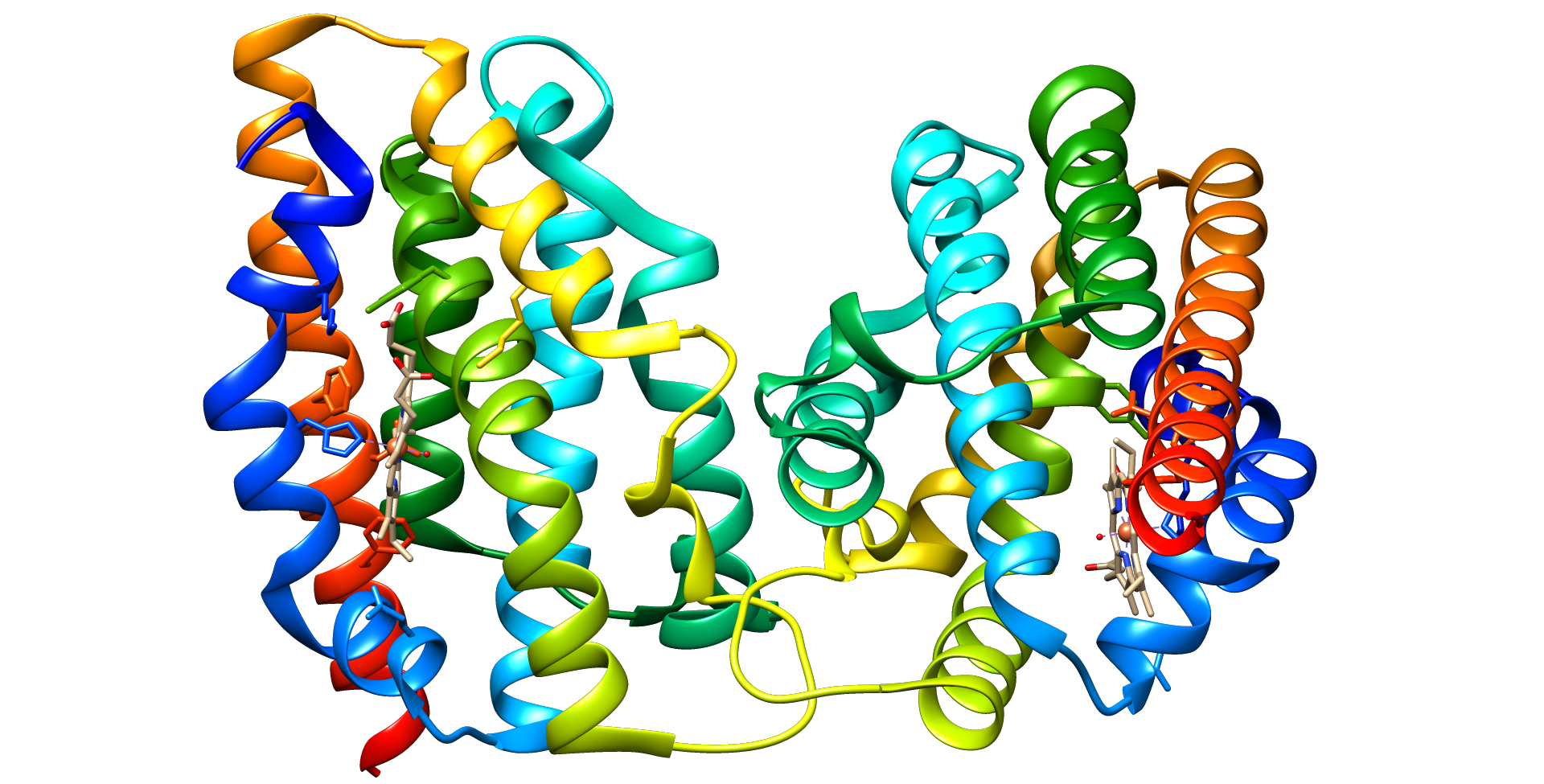

Identifiers
- Aliases: HMOX1, HMOX1D, HO-1, HSP32, bK286B10, heme oxygenase 1
- External IDs: OMIM: 141250; MGI: 96163; GeneCards: HMOX1
Available structures
PDB	Ortholog search: PDBe RCSB
PDB	List of PDB id codes 1N3U, 1N45, 1NI6, 1OYK, 1OYL, 1OZE, 1OZL, 1OZR, 1OZW, 1S13, 1S8C, 1T5P, 1TWN, 1TWR, 1XJZ, 1XK0, 1XK1, 1XK2, 1XK3, 3CZY, 3HOK, 3K4F, 3TGM, 4WD4, 5BTQ
Enzyme activity
EC #	BRENDA	ExPASy	KEGG	MetaCyc
1.14.14.18	↗	↗	↗	↗

Gene location (Human)
Chr.	Chromosome 22 (human)
Band	22q12.3	Start	35,380,361 bp
Band	22q12.3	End	35,394,214 bp

Gene location (Mouse)
Chr.	Chromosome 8 (mouse)
Band	8 35.59 cM|8 C1	Start	75,820,249 bp
Band	8 35.59 cM|8 C1	End	75,827,217 bp
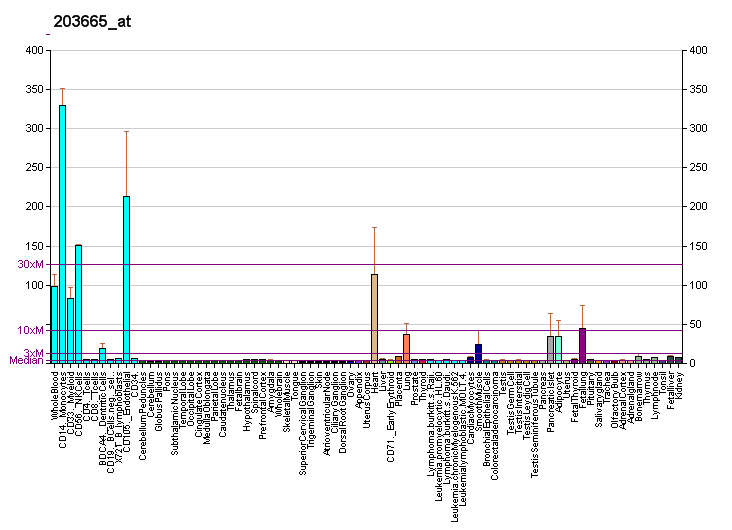
RNA expression pattern
Bgee	Human / Mouse (ortholog); Top expressed in: cartilage tissue; spleen; monocyte; granulocyte; islet of Langerhans; left ovary; mucosa of transverse colon; skin of leg; gallbladder; right ovary / Top expressed in: stroma of bone marrow; spleen; tibiofemoral joint; lens; granulocyte; lip; esophagus; placenta; calvaria; yolk sac; More reference expression data
BioGPS	More reference expression data
Gene ontology
Molecular function	phospholipase D activity; protein homodimerization activity; heme oxygenase (decyclizing) activity; metal ion binding; signal transducer activity; heme binding; protein binding; enzyme binding; oxidoreductase activity
Cellular component	cytosol; endoplasmic reticulum membrane; membrane; intracellular membrane-bounded organelle; nucleolus; endoplasmic reticulum; caveola; perinuclear region of cytoplasm; nucleus; extracellular space
Biological process	negative regulation of neuron apoptotic process; apoptotic process; cellular iron ion homeostasis; negative regulation of smooth muscle cell proliferation; cellular response to heat; intracellular signal transduction; negative regulation of mast cell cytokine production; response to hypoxia; excretion; low-density lipoprotein particle clearance; regulation of transcription from RNA polymerase II promoter in response to oxidative stress; small GTPase mediated signal transduction; negative regulation of DNA binding; response to nicotine; iron ion homeostasis; cell death; heme oxidation; negative regulation of mast cell degranulation; cellular response to cadmium ion; regulation of angiogenesis; negative regulation of muscle cell apoptotic process; response to oxidative stress; negative regulation of DNA-binding transcription factor activity; cellular response to nutrient; positive regulation of angiogenesis; response to estrogen; wound healing involved in inflammatory response; regulation of blood pressure; heme catabolic process; erythrocyte homeostasis; regulation of DNA-binding transcription factor activity; cellular response to arsenic-containing substance; negative regulation of extrinsic apoptotic signaling pathway via death domain receptors; angiogenesis; intrinsic apoptotic signaling pathway in response to DNA damage; endothelial cell proliferation; positive regulation of I-kappaB kinase/NF-kappaB signaling; smooth muscle hyperplasia; protein homooligomerization; negative regulation of leukocyte migration; cellular response to hypoxia; response to hydrogen peroxide; negative regulation of cell population proliferation; heme metabolic process; positive regulation of smooth muscle cell proliferation; regulation of transcription from RNA polymerase II promoter in response to iron; positive regulation of apoptotic process; cellular response to cisplatin; positive regulation of macroautophagy; negative regulation of vascular associated smooth muscle cell proliferation; negative regulation of epithelial cell apoptotic process; liver regeneration; negative regulation of macroautophagy
Sources:Amigo / QuickGO
Orthologs
Databases	NCBI: entry; OMA: entry
Species	Human	Mouse
Entrez	3162	15368
Ensembl	ENSG00000100292	ENSMUSG00000005413
UniProt	P09601	P14901
RefSeq (mRNA)	NM_002133	NM_010442
RefSeq (protein)	NP_002124	NP_034572
Location (UCSC)	Chr 22: 35.38 – 35.39 Mb	Chr 8: 75.82 – 75.83 Mb
PubMed search
- Wikidata
View/Edit Human	View/Edit Mouse

HMOX1 (heme oxygenase 1 gene) is a human gene that encodes for the enzyme heme oxygenase 1 (EC 1.14.14.18). Heme oxygenase (abbreviated HMOX or HO) mediates the first step of heme catabolism, it cleaves heme to form biliverdin.

The HMOX gene is located on the long (q) arm of chromosome 22 at position 12.3, from base pair 34,101,636 to base pair 34,114,748.

== Related conditions ==
- Heme oxygenase-1 deficiency

== Heme oxygenase ==
Heme oxygenase, an essential enzyme in heme catabolism, cleaves heme to form biliverdin, carbon monoxide, and ferrous iron. The biliverdin is subsequently converted to bilirubin by biliverdin reductase. Heme oxygenase activity is induced by its substrate heme and by various nonheme substances. Heme oxygenase occurs as 2 isozymes, an inducible heme oxygenase-1 and a constitutive heme oxygenase-2. HMOX1 and HMOX2 belong to the heme oxygenase family.

== See also ==
- HMOX2
- Focal segmental glomerulosclerosis
