= Ludwik Teichmann =

Polish anatomist (1823–1895)

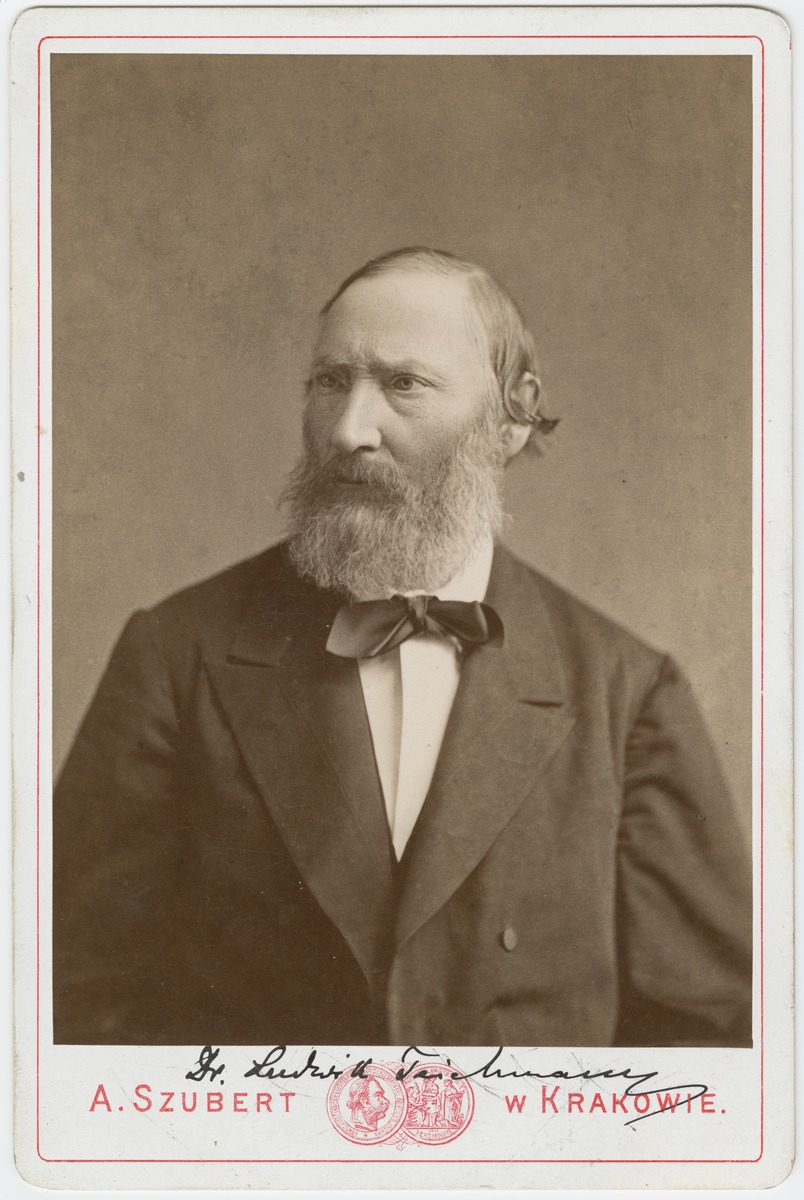
- Teichmann in 1881
- Born: Ludwik Karol Teichmann-Stawiarski; 16 September 1823; Lublin, Poland
- Died: 24 November 1895 (aged 72); Kraków, Poland
- Education: University of Göttingen
- Occupation: anatomist
- Known for: discovery of hemin

Ludwik Karol Teichmann-Stawiarski (September 16, 1823 – November 24, 1895) was a Polish anatomist and discoverer of a new way of research in forensic medicine, after whom Teichmann crystals are called.

== Life ==
Teichmann was born on 16 September 1823 in Lublin.

In 1856, Teichmann became a Doctor of Medicine at the University of Göttingen. In 1861, he became a Professor of pathological anatomy at the Jagiellonian University in Kraków. and in 1868 he became a professor of descriptive and comparative anatomy there, where he also served as Rector from 1877 to 1878.

He introduced injection and corrosion techniques into pathology and used them to study the lymphatic system in health and disease. He discovered haemin crystals, now known as Teichmann's crystals.

Teichmann died on 24 November 1895 in Kraków.

== Works ==
Among his works, Das saugadersystem vom anatomischen standpunkte (1861) in particular acquired recognition.

== See also ==
- Hemin
