= Rudi Schmid =

Swiss-born American hepatologist (1922–2007)

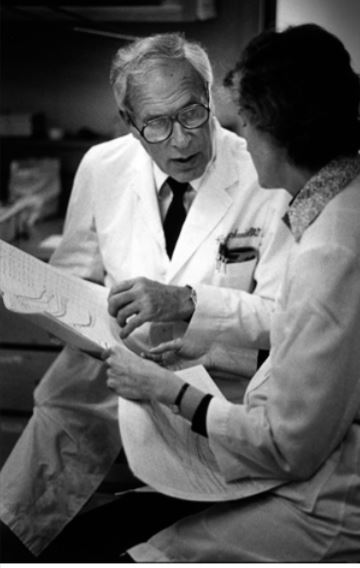
- Professor Rudi Schmid reviewing data with long-standing research assistant and lab supervisor, the late Lydia Hammaker.
- Born: May 2, 1922; Glarus, Switzerland
- Died: October 20, 2007 (aged 85); Kentfield, California
- Citizenship: Swiss/American
- Education: University of Zurich; UCSF; University of Minnesota; Columbia University
- Known for: Hepatology, discovery of heme oxygenase
- Awards: UCSF Medal; The Julius Friedenwald Medal of the American Gastroenterological Association Honors: President of the Association of American Physicians; President of the American Association for the Study of Liver Diseases Membership: National Academy of Sciences; National Academy of Medicine; American Academy of Arts and Sciences; German Academy of Sciences Leopoldina; Swiss Academy of Medical Sciences
- Scientific career
- Fields: Hepatology
- Workplaces: NIH; Harvard Medical School; University of Chicago; UCSF School of Medicine
- Doctoral advisors: Cecil Watson, Samuel Schwartz, David Shemin

Rudi Schmid (2 May 1922 – 20 October 2007) was a Swiss-born American medical researcher specializing in hepatology. Among his contributions to biomedical science, Schmid led a team to discover heme oxygenase.

Schmid was born on 2 May 1922 to physician parents. He was born and raised in Glarus, which inspired his interest in mountain climbing. Schmid became a skilled alpinist and skier. Schmid was a member of the Swiss national ski team from 1941 to 1945, and led the Academic Alpine Club while studying at the University of Zurich. In 1946, while still at university, Schmid became one of the first climbers to ascend Mont Blanc via its west face.

He graduated from medical school in 1947, and the next year helped organize an expedition to the Cordillera Blanca range in Peru for members of the Swiss Academic Club Alpine. While recovering from injuries during his time in Peru, Schmid met Salvatore Lucia, who suggested to Schmid that he apply to the University of California, San Francisco, where Lucia taught. After completing the UCSF medical internship program, Schmid began his residency and doctoral study at the University of Minnesota Medical School under Cecil Watson and Samuel Schwartz. While pursuing advanced medical studies, Schmid married Sonja Wild in Sacramento, and naturalized as an American citizen in 1954, upon completing his degree.

Schmid was a postdoctoral researcher at Columbia University, then worked for the National Institutes of Health before joining the Thorndike Memorial Laboratory, a division of the Harvard Medical Unit at Boston City Hospital. He began teaching at the University of Chicago in 1962. Four years later, Schmid joined the UCSF faculty. He was dean of the UCSF School of Medicine from 1983 to 1989.

Over the course of his career, Schmid was granted membership into the National Academy of Sciences, the Institute of Medicine, and the Academy of Sciences Leopoldina. He was later honored with the establishment of the Rudi Schmid Distinguished Professorship in Neurology at UCSF.

Schmid died of pulmonary failure on 20 October 2007, at home in Kentfield, California, aged 85.
