= Acireductone dioxygenase (iron(II)-requiring) =

Class of enzymes

acireductone dioxygenase [iron(II)-requiring]

Identifiers
- EC no.: 1.13.11.54

Databases
- IntEnz: IntEnz view
- BRENDA: BRENDA entry
- ExPASy: NiceZyme view
- KEGG: KEGG entry
- MetaCyc: metabolic pathway
- PRIAM: profile
- PDB structures: RCSB PDB PDBe PDBsum
- Gene Ontology: AmiGO / QuickGO
Search
- PMC: articles
- PubMed: articles
- NCBI: proteins

Acireductone dioxygenase [iron(II)-requiring] (EC 1.13.11.54) is an enzyme that catalyzes the chemical reaction

1,2-dihydroxy-5-(methylthio)pent-1-en-3-one
O_{2}
4-(methylthio)-2-oxobutanoic acid
+
formic acid

The two substrates of this enzyme are 1,2-dihydroxy-5-(methylthio)pent-1-en-3-one and oxygen. Its products are 4-(methylthio)-2-oxobutanoic acid and formic acid.

This enzyme belongs to the family of oxidoreductases, specifically those acting on single donors with O_{2} as oxidant and incorporation of two atoms of oxygen into the substrate (oxygenases). The oxygen incorporated need not be derived from O_{2}. The systematic name of this enzyme class is 1,2-dihydroxy-5-(methylthio)pent-1-en-3-one:oxygen oxidoreductase (formate-forming). Other names in common use include ARD', 2-hydroxy-3-keto-5-thiomethylpent-1-ene dioxygenase (ambiguous), acireductone dioxygenase (ambiguous), E-2', and E-3 dioxygenase. It participates in the methionine salvage pathway in the bacterium Klebsiella pneumoniae.

The protein component of the enzyme is identical to that in acireductone dioxygenase (Ni2+-requiring), which uses nickel(II) rather than iron(II) as the metal at the centre of the active site.

== Structural studies ==
As of late 2007, only one structure has been solved for this class of enzymes, with the PDB accession code 2HJI.
