= Keto acid =

Organic compounds with a –COOH group and a C=O group

Pyruvic acid (top), acetoacetic acid and levulinic acid (bottom)

In organic chemistry, keto acids or ketoacids (also called oxo carboxylic acids) are organic compounds that contain a carboxylic acid group (−COOH) and a ketone group (>C=O). In several cases, the keto group hydrates to the corresponding acetal in aqueous solution. The alpha-keto acids are especially important in biology as they are involved in the Krebs citric acid cycle and in glycolysis.

== Common types of keto acids ==
=== Alpha-keto acids ===
Also known as alpha-ketoacids and 2-oxoacids, these compounds have the keto group adjacent to the carboxylic acid. They often arise by oxidative deamination of amino acids, and reciprocally, they are precursors to the same. Alpha-keto acids possesses extensive chemistry as acylation agents. Furthermore, alpha-keto acids such as phenylpyruvic acid are endogenous sources for carbon monoxide (as a gasotransmitter) and pharmaceutical prodrug scaffold. Important representatives:

  - pyruvic acid, pervasive intermediate in metabolism.
  - oxaloacetic acid, a component of the Krebs cycle.
  - alpha-ketoglutaric acid, a 5-carbon ketoacid derived from glutamic acid. Alpha-ketoglutarate participates in cell signaling by functioning as a coenzyme. It is commonly used in transamination reactions.
  - 2-Oxoadipic acid

Alpha keto acids are used primarily as energy for liver cells and in fatty acid synthesis, also in the liver.

=== Beta-keto acids ===
Beta-keto acids (beta-ketoacids, or 3-oxoacids) have the ketone group at the second carbon from the carboxylic acid. They generally form by the Claisen condensation. The presence of the keto group at the beta position allows them to easily undergo thermal decarboxylation.

- Acetoacetic acid is the parent of this series.

=== Other keto acids ===
Gamma-keto acids (Gamma-ketoacids, or 4-oxoacids) have the ketone group at the third carbon from the carboxylic acid. Levulinic acid is an example.

5-Ooxo-octanoic acid is converted in enzymatic and non-enzymatic steps into the cyclic class of coniine alkaloids. Keto acids appear in a wide variety of anabolic pathways in metabolism. For instance, in plants (specifically, in hemlock, pitcher plants, and fool's parsley).

== See also ==
- Ulosonic acids
- Pseudoacid
