= Maria Angela Ardinghelli =

Italian mathematician, physicist, and translator

- Portrait medallion by Jean-Jacques Caffieri (1755). Archives de l’Académie des Sciences, Paris. © Académie des Sciences—Institut de France
- Born: 28 May 1728; Naples, Campania, Italy
- Died: 17 February 1825 (aged 96); Naples, Campania, Italy
- Known for: Italian translation of the works of Stephen Hales
- Scientific career
- Fields: Mathematics, Physics
- Patrons: Jean-Antoine Nollet

Maria Angela Ardinghelli, also known as Mariangela Ardinghelli (Naples, 28 May 1728 – Naples, 17 February 1825) was an Italian translator, mathematician, physicist and noble, mostly known as the Italian translator of the works of Stephen Hales, a Newtonian physiologist. She translated two of his works; Haemastaticks and Vegetable Staticks. Aside from Ardinghelli's historical invisibility, she managed to remain relevant without being shunned into social isolation or derision by sharing her works with specific audiences.

== Background ==
Maria Angela Ardinghelli was born in Naples (Kingdom of Naples) into a noble family of Florentine origin. Having lost her brother during their childhood, Maria Angela thus became an only child. Her father turned to educating her, and by the age of fourteen she was fluent in Latin. She studied philosophy and physical-mathematical sciences under the physicist and mathematician Giovanni Maria Della Torre and Vito Caravelli. She also studied English and French.

Ardinghelli was neither an aristocrat nor a member of the ascendant middle class. Her family was from Florence, described as “one of the most distinguished and ancient of Italy”, in the sixteenth century. When the Medici family climbed into power in Tuscany the Ardinghelli family fled Tuscany for Naples.

As was obligatory for the aristocratic women of the time, Maria Angela was a literate poet and Latinist, as well as an expert in mathematical physics. She belonged to the circle of the prince of Tarsia, founded in 1747, which, in intellectual circles in Naples, had the strongest association with Newton, experimental physics and electricity. The library and the laboratory of Tarsia were to be of much use to her.

Ardinghelli never wanted to leave Naples. She made it clear that she would never leave her family, rejecting marriage with French architect Julien Leroy and the possibility of becoming the scientific tutor to the royal princesses at Versailles. She stayed in Naples where she hosted many conversazioni as meeting points for traveling naturalists and corresponding with the Paris Academy of Science.

Maria Angela Ardinghelli had acted as an informal correspondent for the Paris Academy of Sciences. She had connected the scientific communities of Naples and France. When Maria Angela reached the apex of her popularity she devised a few strategies to maintain her anonymity, which she succeeded at. In spite of Ardinghelli's historical invisibility, she selectively chose from her works what she wanted visible to specific audiences in order to protect herself from social isolation.

=== Ardinghelli and Nollet ===
As a correspondent and member of the Paris Academy of Sciences, Maria Angela was catapulted to fame by abbé Jean-Antoine Nollet. Nollet met Ardinghelli at conversazioni, hosted by her in Naples during his journey through Italy in 1749. Nollet, an acclaimed celebrity, published a volume on electricity in which he needed to defend his theories against those of Benjamin Franklin. Nollet wrote nine letters to nine different savants distinguished in the field of physics. The first letter was to Ardinghelli. In the letter he writes about her translation of Hales's Haemastaticks and writes: “very virtuous young lady, who in a short time has made a lot of progress in the field of physics.” This public declaration of esteem made Ardinghelli well known.

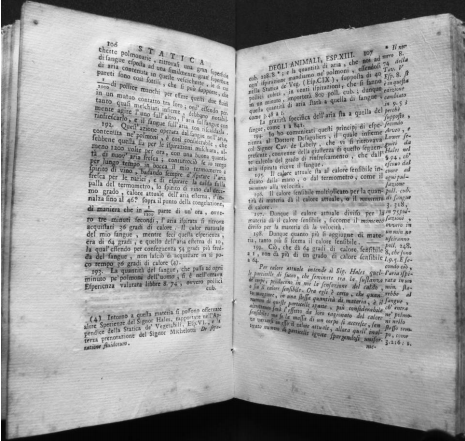
Page from Stephen Hales, Emastatica, o sia, Statica degli animali [trans. Ardinghelli] (Naples, 1750): the numbered footnote on the bottom left is by De Sauvages, the italicized note marked by an asterisk on the right margin and the italicized text inserted in the main page (on the right) are by Ardinghelli. Courtesy of Medical Historical Library, Yale University.

== Accomplishments ==
Expert in mathematical physics, Ardinghelli's fame is mainly due to the translation of key works of the English physicist Stephen Hales Haemastaticks and Vegetable Staticks. She also performed scientific experiments inspired by Hales works. She was identified as an informal correspondent and cultural mediator for foreign scientists and naturalists traveling to Italy. Being a mediator opened a door and put her in the position to meet Jean-Antoine Nollet, who appointed her to be an informal correspondent for the Paris Academy of Sciences. Working for the Paris Academy of Sciences had her connection to the scientific communities of France and Naples.

In Maria Angela's translations, she broadened herself to more than just the footnotes that typical translators confined themselves to. She opened herself in the dedication and in the "To the Reader" sections of her translations. In these sections, she opened herself up to the members of higher classes. She corresponded with leading scientists of the time, including, to name a few, the mathematician and astronomer and physicist Alexis Claude Clairaut and Jean-Antoine Nollet.

== Other ==
In 2016 Paola Bertucci's article about Maria Angela, "The In/visible Woman: Mariangela Ardinghelli and the Circulation of Knowledge between Paris and Naples in the Eighteenth Century", Isis, Vol. 104, No. 2 (June 2013), pp. 226–249, received the Margaret W. Rossiter History of Women in Science Prize.
