= Pneumatic chemistry =

Area of scientific research

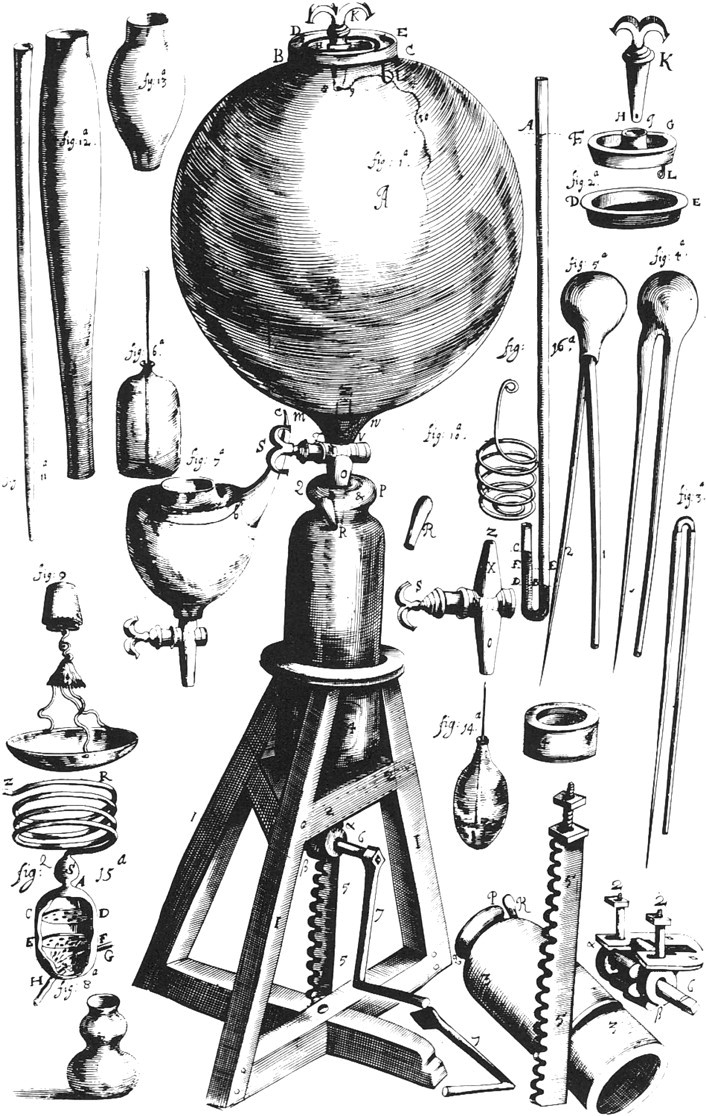
Robert Boyle's air pump

In the history of science, pneumatic chemistry is an area of scientific research of the seventeenth, eighteenth, and early nineteenth centuries. Important goals of this work were the understanding of the physical properties of gases, known as factitious airs at the time, and how they relate to chemical reactions and, ultimately, the composition of matter. The rise of phlogiston theory, and its replacement by a new theory after the discovery of oxygen as a gaseous component of the Earth atmosphere and a chemical reagent participating in the combustion reactions, were addressed in the era of pneumatic chemistry.

== Air as a reagent ==
In the eighteenth century, as the field of chemistry was evolving from alchemy, a field of the natural philosophy was created around the idea of air as a reagent. Before this, air was primarily considered a static substance that would not react and simply existed. However, as Lavoisier and several other pneumatic chemists would insist, the air was indeed dynamic, and would not only be influenced by combusted material, but would also influence the properties of different substances.

The initial concern of pneumatic chemistry was combustion reactions, beginning with Stephen Hales. These reactions would give off different "airs" as chemists would call them, and these different airs contained more simple substances. Until Lavoisier, these airs were considered separate entities with different properties; Lavoisier was responsible largely for changing the idea of air as being constituted by these different airs that his contemporaries and earlier chemists had discovered.

This study of gases was brought about by Hales with the invention of the pneumatic trough, an instrument capable of collecting the gas given off by reactions with reproducible results. The term gas was coined by J. B. van Helmont, in the early seventeenth century. This term was derived from the Ancient Greek word χάος, chaos, as a result of his inability to collect properly the substances given off by reactions, as he was the first natural philosopher to make an attempt at carefully studying the third type of matter. However, it was not until Lavoisier performed his research in the eighteenth century that the word was used universally by scientists as a replacement for airs.

Van Helmont (1579 – 1644) is sometimes considered the founder of pneumatic chemistry, as he was the first natural philosopher to take an interest in air as a reagent. Alessandro Volta began investigating pneumatic chemistry in 1776 and argued that there were different types of inflammable air based on experiments on marsh gases. Pneumatic chemists credited with discovering chemical elements include Joseph Priestley, Henry Cavendish, Joseph Black, Daniel Rutherford, and Carl Scheele. Other individuals who investigated gases during this period include Robert Boyle, Stephen Hales, William Brownrigg, Antoine Lavoisier, Joseph Louis Gay-Lussac, and John Dalton.

== History ==
=== Chemical revolution ===
"In the years between 1770 and 1785, chemists all over Europe started catching, isolating, and weighing different gasses."

The pneumatic trough was integral to the work with gases (or, as contemporary chemists called them, airs). Work done by Joseph Black, Joseph Priestley, Herman Boerhaave, and Henry Cavendish revolved largely around the use of the instrument, allowing them to collect airs given off by different chemical reactions and combustion analyses. Their work led to the discovery of many types of airs, such as dephlogisticated air (discovered by Joseph Priestley).

Moreover, the chemistry of airs was not limited to combustion analyses. During the eighteenth century, many chymists used the discovery of airs as a new path for exploring old problems, with one example being the field of medicinal chemistry. One particular Englishman, James Watt, began to take the idea of airs and use them in what was referred to as pneumatic therapy, or the use of airs to make laboratories more workable with fresh airs and also aid patients with different illnesses, with varying degrees of success. Most human experimentation done was performed on the chymists themselves, as they believed that self-experimentation was a necessary part or progressing the field.

== Contributors ==
=== James Watt ===
James Watt's research in pneumatic chemistry involved the use of inflammable (H_{2}) and dephlogisticated (O_{2}) airs to create water. In 1783, James Watt showed that water was composed of inflammable and dephlogisticated airs, and that the masses of gases before combustion were exactly equal to the mass of water after combustion. Until this point, water was viewed as a fundamental element rather than a compound. James Watt also sought to explore the use of different "factitious airs" such as hydrocarbonate in medicinal treatments as "pneumatic therapy" by collaborating with Dr. Thomas Beddoes and Erasmus Darwin to treat Jessie Watt, his daughter suffering from tuberculosis, using fixed air.

=== Joseph Black ===
Joseph Black was a chemist who took interest in the pneumatic field after studying under William Cullen. He was first interested in the topic of magnesia alba, or magnesium carbonate (MgCO_{3}), and limestone, or calcium carbonate (CaCO_{3}), and wrote a dissertation called "De humore acido a cibis orto, et magnesia alba" on the properties of both. His experiments on magnesium carbonate led him to discover that fixed air, or carbon dioxide (CO_{2}), was being given off during reactions with various chemicals, including breathing. Despite him never using the pneumatic trough or other instrumentation invented to collect and analyze the airs, his inferences led to more research into fixed air instead of common air, with the trough actually being used.

Gaseous ammonia was first isolated by Joseph Black in 1756 by reacting sal ammoniac (ammonium chloride) with calcined magnesia (magnesium oxide). It was isolated again by Peter Woulfe in 1767, by Carl Wilhelm Scheele in 1770

=== Joseph Priestley ===
Joseph Priestley, in Observations on different kinds of air, was one of the first people to describe air as being composed of different states of matter, and not as one element. Priestley elaborated on the notions of fixed air (CO_{2}), mephitic air and inflammable air to include "inflammable nitrous air," "vitriolic acid air," "alkaline air" and "dephlogisticated air". Priestley also described the process of respiration in terms of phlogiston theory. Priestley also established a process for treating scurvy and other ailments using fixed air in his Directions for impregnating water with fixed air. Priestley's work on pneumatic chemistry had an influence on his natural world views. His belief in an "aerial economy" stemmed from his belief in "dephlogisticated air" being the purest type of air and that phlogiston and combustion were at the heart of nature. Joseph Priestley chiefly researched with the pneumatic trough, but he was responsible for collecting several new water-soluble airs. This was achieved primarily by his substitution of mercury for water, and implementing a shelf under the head for increased stability, capitalizing on the idea Cavendish proposed and popularizing the mercury pneumatic trough.

=== Herman Boerhaave ===
While not credited for direct research into the field of pneumatic chemistry, Boerhaave (teacher, researcher, and scholar) did publish the Elementa Chimiae in 1727. This treatise included support for Hales' work and also elaborated upon the idea of airs. Despite not publishing his own research, this section on airs in the Elementa Chimiae was cited by many other contemporaries and contained much of the current knowledge of the properties of airs. Boerhaave is also credited with adding to the world of chemical thermometry through his work with Daniel Fahrenheit, also discussed in Elementa Chimiae.

=== Henry Cavendish ===
Henry Cavendish, despite not being the first to replace water in the trough with mercury, was among the first to observe that fixed air was insoluble over mercury and therefore could be collected more efficiently using the adapted instrument. He also characterized fixed air (CO_{2}) and inflammable air (H_{2}). Inflammable air was one of the first gases isolated and discovered using the pneumatic trough. However, he did not exploit his own idea to its limit, and therefore did not use the mercury pneumatic trough to its full extent. Cavendish is credited with nearly correctly analyzing the content of gases in the atmosphere. Cavendish also showed that inflammable air and atmospheric air could be combined and heated to produce water in 1784.

=== Stephen Hales ===
In the eighteenth century, with the rise of combustion analysis in chemistry, Stephen Hales invented the pneumatic trough in order to collect gases from the samples of matter he used; while uninterested in the properties of the gases he collected, he wanted to explore how much gas was given off from the materials he burned or let ferment. Hales was successful in preventing the air from losing its "elasticity," i.e. preventing it from experiencing a loss in volume, by bubbling the gas through water, and therefore dissolving the soluble gases.

After the invention of the pneumatic trough, Stephen Hales continued his research into the different airs, and performed many Newtonian analyses of the various properties of them. He published his book Vegetable Staticks in 1727, which had a profound impact on the field of pneumatic chemistry, as many researchers cited this in their academic papers. In Vegetable Staticks, Hales not only introduced his trough, but also published the results he obtained from the collected air, such as the elasticity and composition of airs along with their ability to mix with others.

== Instrumentation ==
=== Pneumatic trough ===
Stephen Hales, called the creator of pneumatic chemistry, created the pneumatic trough in 1727. This instrument was widely used by many chemists to explore the properties of different airs, such as what was called inflammable air (what is modernly called hydrogen). Lavoisier used this in addition to his gasometer to collect gases and analyze them, aiding him in creating his list of simple substances.

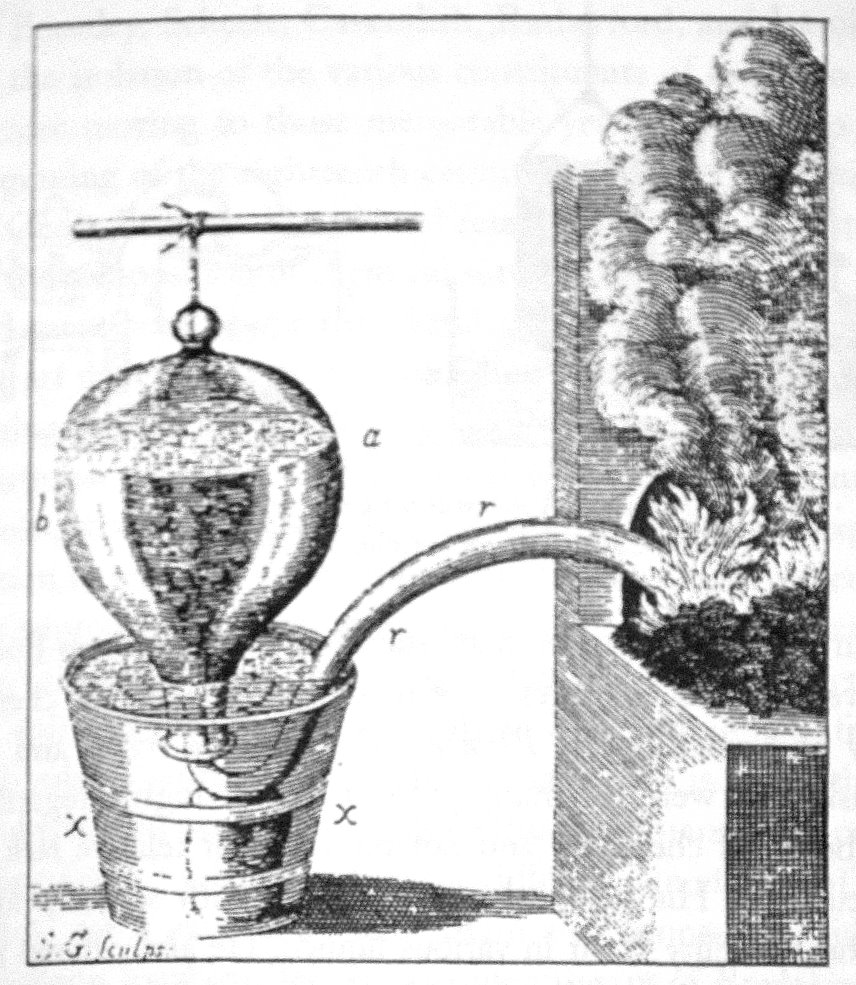
The pneumatic trough, invented by Stephen Hales in the 1700s. This was the initial model, used for the collection of airs (gases) produced by combustion.

The pneumatic trough, while integral throughout the eighteenth century, was modified several times to collect gases more efficiently or just to collect more gas. For example, Cavendish noted that the amount of fixed air that was given off by a reaction was not entirely present above the water; this meant that fixed water was absorbing some of this air, and could not be used quantitatively to collect that particular air. So, he replaced the water in the trough with mercury instead, in which most airs were not soluble. By doing so, he could not only collect all airs given off by a reaction, but he could also determine the solubility of airs in water, beginning a new area of research for pneumatic chemists. While this was the major adaptation of the trough in the eighteenth century, several minor changes were made before and after this substitution of mercury for water, such as adding a shelf to rest the head on while gas collection occurred. This shelf would also allow for less conventional heads to be used, such as Brownrigg's animal bladder.

A practical application of a pneumatic trough was the eudiometer, which was used by Jan Ingenhousz to show that plants produced dephlogisticated air when exposed to sunlight, a process now called photosynthesis.

=== Gasometer ===
During his chemical revolution, Lavoisier created a new instrument for precisely measuring out gases. He called this instrument the gazomètre. He had two different versions; the one he used in demonstrations to the Académie and to the public, which was a large expensive version meant to make people believe that it had a large precision, and the smaller, more lab practical, version with a similar precision. This more practical version was cheaper to construct, allowing more chemists to use Lavoisier's instrument.

== See also ==
- Beehive shelf
- Pneumatic Institution
