= Archeus =

Aspect of the astral plane in alchemy

In alchemy, Archeus, or archaeus, is a term used generally to refer to the lowest and most dense aspect of the astral plane which presides over the growth and continuation of all living beings. The term was used by medieval Paracelsus and those after him, such as Jan Baptist van Helmont.

To define it, the philosophers maintained that the Archeus was the segment of the closest quadrant of the higher worlds which blends with some similarity to the highest vibrations of our physical world. Essentially it was seen as the gray area wherein matter, speaking parallel and not laterally, begins to transmute into spiritual energies. In effect, it is the glue which binds the heavens to the material, and so allows the maxim as above, so below.

Apart from the Archeus, which is primarily a Platonic name for the subject, this sphere is also called the Anima Mundi, Soul of the World, Spirit of the World, The Transitive LVX, The Path of Saturn (connecting Malkuth and Yesod in the system of Jewish mysticism called the Kabbalah), the Earth Sphere and the Zone Girdling the Earth. It is also sometimes simply called the lower astral sphere, or its geographic region, as all imaginations in the Archeus parallel physical manifestation.

The term was also used for the nature of fire, or the fire lodged in the center of the Earth, to which was ascribed the generation of metals and minerals, and which was believed to be the principle of life in vegetables.

The philosophy which discusses the Archeus in the most detail is medieval hermetic science, where we find the occult author Heinrich Cornelius Agrippa speaking at length about a previously purely Platonic subject. This he likely derived from his teacher in hermetic science, a man by the name of Trithemius, who studied extensively under certain Neoplatonic philosophers.

It is worth mentioning that the Archeus can be broken down into four different ethers: Chemical, Life, Light, and Reflective. To discuss them briefly as certain mystics saw them, the Chemical Ether composes the substances within which energies responsible for the perpetuation of chemical actions in the world exist.

The Life Ether composes the substances through which the Vital Force exists and is transmitted, and which forms a matrix to hold in the Life Spark of a living being. All living beings contain both a chemical and life aura to them; the former, to the clairvoyant, is usually a subtle light-red flame. The latter is usually a static streaming of blue and white light.

The Light Ether is the highest ether at play in the physical world, and is the actual medium by which means the programmed virtues of objects travel down from the higher spheres of existence and impregnate their appropriate physical vessels. It is with the property of this ether that we are most concerned, for some of the greatest miracles in magic are accomplished by manipulating the virtues which objects and circumstances receive. It bears mentioning that it is through this Life Ether that the soul of a living being is given unto a body.

The Reflective Ether does not so much importantly act upon the physical world, but does in occasion anyway. If the Akashic Library is to be seen as the Memory of God, then the Reflective Ether would be the memory of Earth. It is through the replay of such memories that hauntings are often created. But the ethers may be reserved for a later lecture: in the meantime let us refer to the matter at hand.

As previously mentioned, the Light Ether brings virtues from higher spheres down into this one, and this requires elaboration. There is a chain of descent from the First Cause, which some call God, all the way to our physical world. In the First Cause there is only one combined energy. As it emanates outwards from this First Cause it begins to divide according to Intelligent Design. Like begins to attract like, opposites begin to repel one another, and in a short time there is a vast array of different combinations of energies which may be called their own units.
