= Beehive shelf =

Laboratory equipment used to collect a gas over water

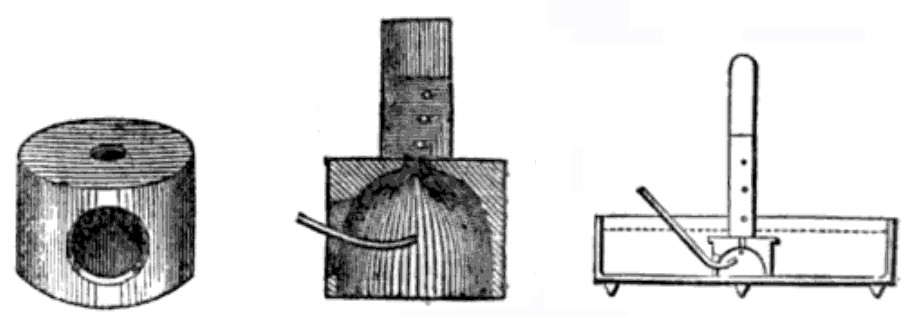
A beehive shelf is shown in the left-hand picture. The middle picture shows the shelf from the side with a gas entering from a tube on the left and bubbling up through a hole. The right-hand drawing is about half the scale of the others and shows the shelf in use inside a pneumatic trough.

A beehive shelf is a piece of laboratory equipment, usually of pottery, used to support a receiving jar or tube while a gas is being collected over water with a pneumatic trough. It is used so that when the gas emerges from the delivery tube into the beehive shelf, it is funneled into the receiving jar instead of being released elsewhere.

== History ==
The name derives from the design of early beehives made from bound grass called a skep. The squat circular shape was made by binding the grass bundles to form a flat wheel. Sides were added using the same material with a cutout to allow honey bees to enter and leave the hive.

== See also ==
- Pneumatic chemistry
