= Giovanni Maria Della Torre =

Italian priest, naturalist and scientist

Giovanni Maria Della Torre FRS
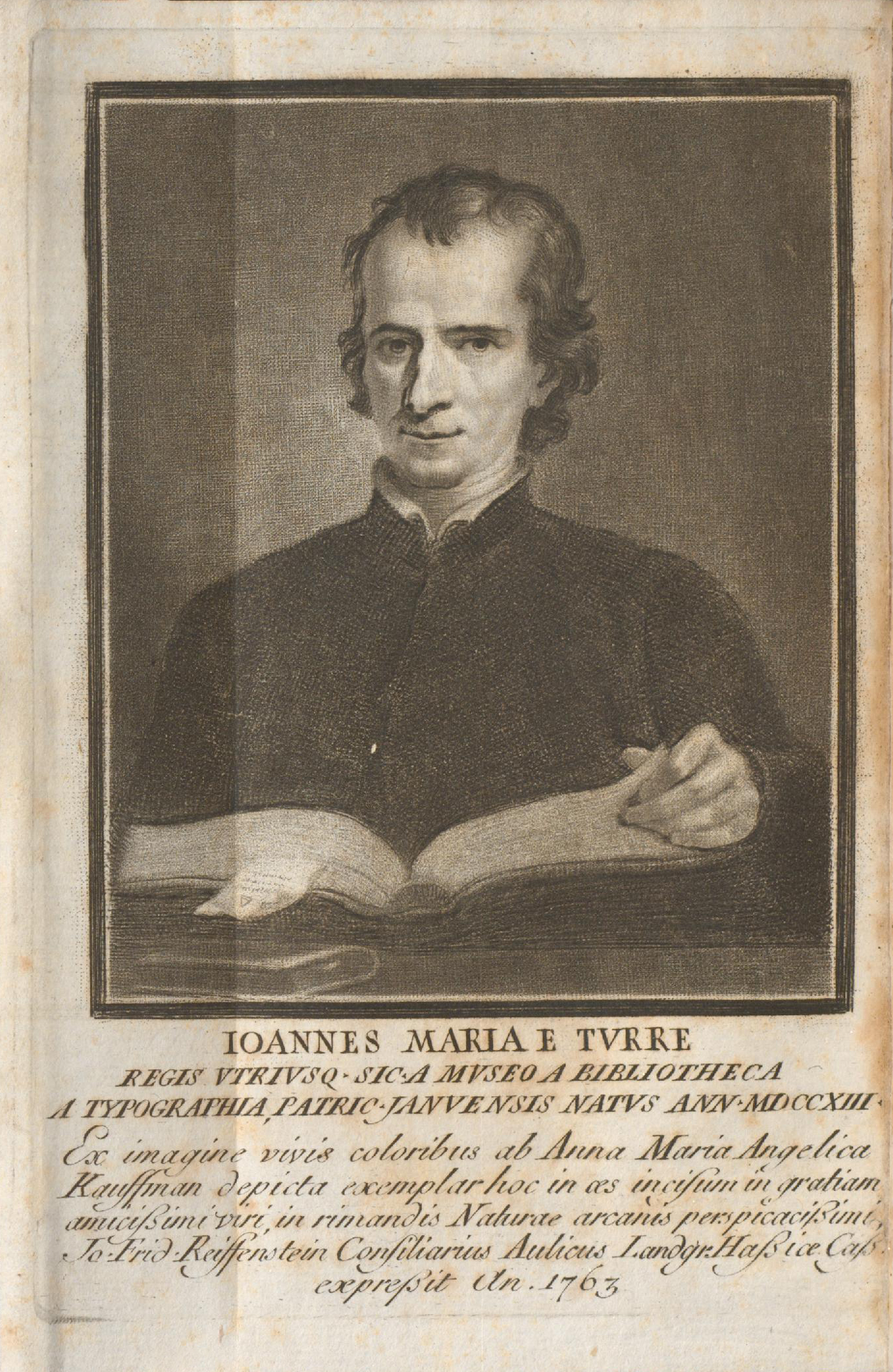
- Giovanni Maria Della Torre
- Born: 16 June 1710; Rome, Lazio, Italy
- Died: 7 March 1782 (aged 71); Naples, Campania, Italy
- Education: Collegio Clementino
- Occupations: Catholic priest; Naturalist; Scientist
- Father: Michele Della Torre
- Scientific career
- Fields: Naturalism, Physics

Giovanni Maria Della Torre FRS (Rome, 16 June 1710 – Naples, 7 March 1782) was an Italian priest, naturalist and scientist who wrote several influential books on natural science and taught at several places around Italy.

== Biography ==
Della Torre was born in Rome, and sources differ on his birth year. His father, Marquis Michele, came from Lavagna but had moved to Genoa. In 1720, Della Torre began his studies at the Clementine College. Under the guidance of the mathematician Domenico Chelucci (1681–1754), General of the Piarist Order, a wholly new type of teachers and professors was being trained here, who were taught the classics thoroughly, but also acquired a sound knowledge of the sciences, of geography and of history.

Della Torre joined the Somaschi Fathers in 1729, taking his final vows on 30 November 1730. From 1736, he taught mathematics at the Clementine College. In 1738 was appointed to teach mathematics and experimental physics in the archepiscopal seminary in Naples. In 1743, Charles III of Bourbon appointed him as his personal Librarian, Superintendent of the Stamperia Reale, and Keeper of the Museum of Capodimonte. Della Torre was a member of the Academy of Sciences of Naples. He was also a corresponding member of the Academies of Sciences of Paris and Berlin, and of the Royal Society of London. He was one of the founding members of the Accademia Ercolanese.

Della Torre was a man of great learning, but his main research fields were microscopy and volcanology. His major contribution was the series of books on the Scienza della natura (Science of Nature) published initially in two volumes (1748-49). The work covers a wide range of scientific subjects in a systematic way and contains many original observations.

Della Torre documented the Vesuvius eruption of 1751 and spent over twenty years studying the eruptive history of the volcano. The result of his research was published in the Storia e fenomeni del Vesuvio (Naples, 1755), widely considered a milestone in the history of volcanology and translated into French as Histoire et phénomènes du Vésuve (Naples, 1771).

In 1763, Della Torre published a detailed account of the observations he had made with a microscope of his own construction. Already in 1751, Della Torre had devised a method of forming over a lamp globules of glass which he then placed in cells of brass, adapted to a screw-barrel microscope. With the aid of these microscope-glasses, he carried out several observations on the shape of the human blood corpuscles, which caused a stir and, often, disagreement among his contemporaries. The research and teaching of Della Torre opened a new field to the Neapolitan naturalists in microscopical investigations.

== Legacy ==
Della Torre is particularly known for his observations of blood corpuscles described in a short publication entitled Praeclarissimo viro abati Noleto, which was printed in 1760. Della Torre wrote letters to a number of scholars, giving them a detailed description of his observations, and sent copies of his essay to others. He also showed his observations to several scholars, who in turn described them to others, as did, for example, Raimondo Cocchi (1733-1775) to Felice Fontana (1730-1803). The shape of the red corpuscles was at the time a much-debated topic. Sénac, for instance, believed they had a 'lenticular' form, whereas Haller held the older view that they were 'spherical'. Della Torre denied that they were spherical and described them as tiny membranaceous bags of a ring-like shape, filled with lymph, and pierced in the middle. His observations generated much sensation, skepticism, and controversy. In response, Della Torre refined his arguments and provided longer descriptions of them in what are probably his two most original works as a microscopist: Nuove osservazioni intorno la storia naturale (Naples, 1763) and Nuove osservazioni microscopiche (Naples, 1776).

== Works ==
- Scienza della natura (in Italian). Vol. 2. Napoli: Raffaele Gessari. 1749.
- Storia e fenomeni del Vesuvio (in Italian). Napoli: Giuseppe Raimondi. 1755.
- Elementa physicae (in Latin). Vol. 3. Napoli: Donato Campo. 1767.
- Elementa physicae (in Latin). Vol. 5. Napoli: Donato Campo. 1767.
- Elementa physicae (in Latin). Vol. 7. Napoli: Donato Campo. 1768.
- Elementa physicae (in Latin). Vol. 8. Napoli: Donato Campo. 1769.
- Elementa physicae (in Latin). Vol. 9. Napoli: Donato Campo. 1769.
- Scienza della natura (in Italian). Vol. 1. Napoli: Raffaele Gessari. 1748.

== Bibliography ==
- Bruno, Giovanni (1949). "Giovanni Maria Della Torre istologo napoletano". Gazzetta Sanitaria. 20: 156–159.
- Mazzolini, Renato G. (1980). "The Iris in Eighteenth-Century physiology". Berner Beiträge zur Geschichte der Medizin und der Naturwissenschaften. IX. Bern.
- Baldini, Ugo (1989). "Della Torre, Giovanni Maria". Dizionario Biografico degli Italiani (in Italian). Vol. 37: Della Fratta–Della Volpaia. Rome: Istituto dell'Enciclopedia Italiana. ISBN 978-88-12-00032-6.
