= Jan Baptist van Helmont =

Chemist and physician (1580–1644)

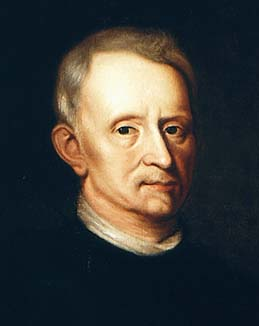
- Portrait of van Helmont by Mary Beale
- Born: 12 January 1580 (Note: Van Helmont's date of birth has been a source of some confusion. According to his own statement (published in his posthumous Ortus medicinae) he was born in 1577. However, the birth register of St Gudula, Brussels, shows him to have been born on 12 January 1579 Old Style, i.e. 12 January 1580 by modern dating. See Partington, J. R. (1936). "Joan Baptista Van Helmont". Annals of Science. 1 (4): 359–84 (359). doi:10.1080/00033793600200291.); Brussels, Spanish Netherlands (present-day Belgium)
- Died: 30 December 1644 (aged 64); Vilvoorde, Spanish Netherlands (present-day Belgium)
- Education: University of Leuven
- Known for: Pneumatic chemistry
- Scientific career
- Fields: Chemistry, physiology, medicine
- Academic advisors: Martin Delrio

Jan Baptist van Helmont (Note: His name is also found rendered as Jan-Baptiste van Helmont, Johannes Baptista van Helmont, Johann Baptista von Helmont, Joan Baptista van Helmont, and other minor variants switching between von and van.) (/ˈhɛlmɒnt/ HEL-mont, Dutch: [ˈjɑm bɑpˈtɪst fɑn ˈɦɛlmɔnt]; 12 January 1580 – 30 December 1644) was a chemist, physiologist, and physician from Brussels. He worked during the years just after Paracelsus and the rise of iatrochemistry, and is sometimes considered to be "the founder of pneumatic chemistry". Van Helmont is remembered today largely for his 5-year willow tree experiment, his introduction of the word "gas" (from the Greek word chaos) into the vocabulary of science, and his ideas on spontaneous generation.

== Early life and education ==
Jan Baptist van Helmont was the youngest of five children of Maria (van) Stassaert and Christiaen van Helmont, a public prosecutor and Brussels council member, who had married in the Sint-Goedele church in 1567. He was educated at Leuven, and after ranging restlessly from one science to another and finding satisfaction in none, turned to medicine. He interrupted his studies, and for a few years he traveled through Switzerland, Italy, France, Germany, and England.

Returning to his own country, van Helmont obtained a medical degree in 1599. He practiced at Antwerp at the time of the great plague in 1605, after which he wrote a book titled De Peste (On Plague), which was reviewed by Newton in 1667. In 1609 he finally obtained his doctoral degree in medicine. The same year he married Margaret van Ranst, who was of a wealthy noble family. Van Helmont and Margaret lived in Vilvoorde, near Brussels, and had six or seven children. The inheritance of his wife enabled him to retire early from his medical practice and occupy himself with chemical experiments until his death on 30 December 1644.

== Scientific ideas ==
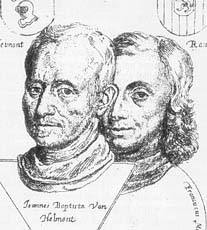
Jan Baptist van Helmont (left) and his son Franciscus-Mercurius, from the Ortus medicinae (first published posthumously in 1648)

=== Mysticism and modern science ===
Van Helmont was a disciple of the mystic and alchemist, Paracelsus, though he scornfully repudiated the errors of most contemporary authorities, including Paracelsus. On the other hand, he engaged in the new learning based on experimentation that was producing men like Santorio Santori, William Harvey, Galileo Galilei, and Francis Bacon.

He made the first proposal of a randomized controlled trial, to test two treatment regimes of fever, in the posthumously published Ortus Medicinae (1648). One treatment would be conducted by practitioners of Galenic medicine involving bloodletting and purging, and the other would be conducted by van Helmont. It is likely that he never conducted the trial, and merely proposed it as an experiment that could be conducted.

Let us take from the itinerants’ hospitals, from the camps or from elsewhere 200 or 500 poor people with fevers, pleurisy etc. and divide them in two: let us cast lots so that one half of them fall to me and the other half to you. I shall cure them without blood-letting or perceptible purging, you will do so according to your knowledge (nor do I even hold you to your boast of abstaining from phlebotomy or purging) and we shall see how many funerals each of us will have: the outcome of the contest shall be the reward of 300 florins deposited by each of us. ... when there is contradiction, of the two proposals only one is true. (Ortus, pp 526–7)

=== Chemistry ===
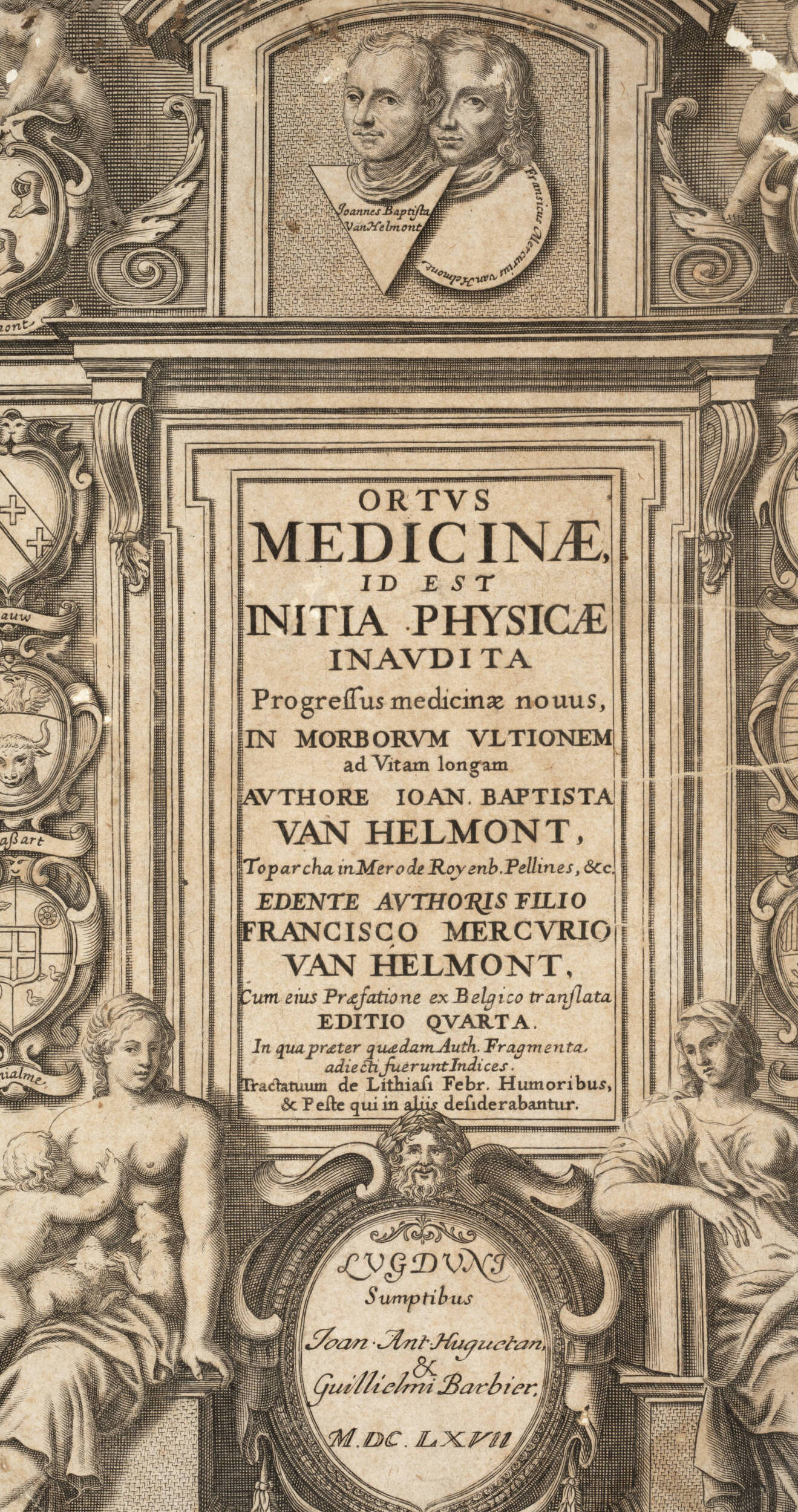
Title page of Ortus medicinae

==== Conservation of mass ====
Van Helmont was a careful observer of nature; his analysis of data gathered in his experiments suggests that he had a concept of the conservation of mass. He was an early experimenter in seeking to determine how plants gain mass.

==== Elements ====
For Van Helmont, air and water were the two primitive elements. Fire he explicitly denied to be an element, nor could earth be called a true element because, he argued, it could be reduced to water.

==== Gases ====
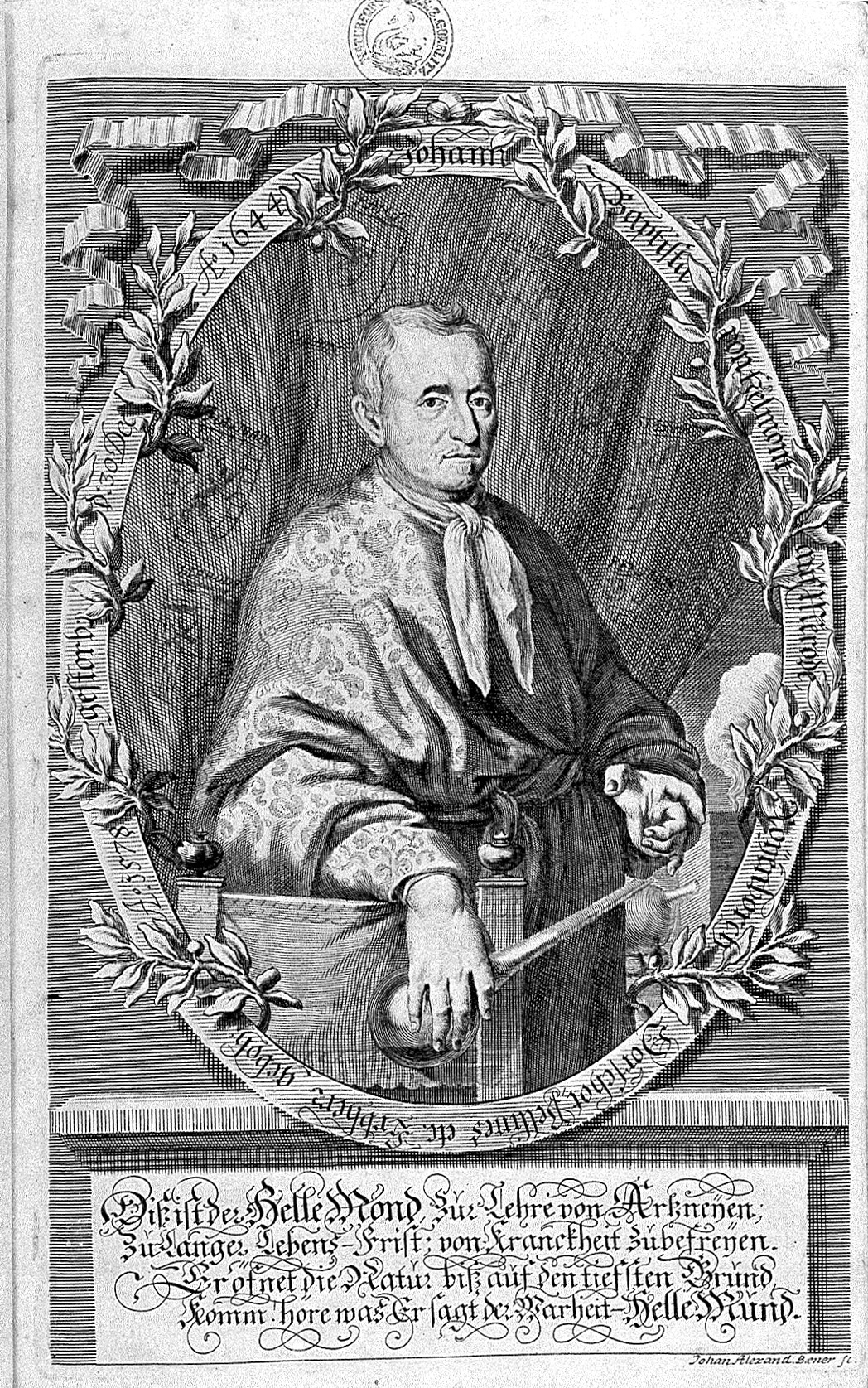
Posthumous portrait of van Helmont

Van Helmont is regarded as the founder of pneumatic chemistry, as he was the first to understand that there are gases distinct in kind from atmospheric air and furthermore invented the word "gas". He derived the word gas from the Greek word chaos (χᾰ́ος).

==== Carbon dioxide ====
He perceived that his "gas sylvestre" (carbon dioxide) given off by burning charcoal, was the same as that produced by fermenting must, a gas which sometimes renders the air of caves unbreathable.

=== Digestion ===
Van Helmont wrote extensively on the subject of digestion. In Oriatrike or Physick Refined (1662, an English translation of Ortus medicinae), van Helmont considered earlier ideas on the subject, such as food being digested through the body's internal heat. But if that were so, he asked, how could cold-blooded animals live? His own opinion was that digestion was aided by a chemical reagent, or "ferment", within the body, such as inside the stomach. Harré suggests that van Helmont's theory was "very near to our modern concept of an enzyme".

Van Helmont proposed and described six different stages of digestion.

=== Willow tree experiment ===
Helmont's experiment on a willow tree has been considered among the earliest quantitative studies on plant nutrition and growth and as a milestone in the history of biology. The experiment was only published posthumously in Ortus Medicinae (1648) and may have been inspired by similar experiments by Santorio, published in Ars de statica medicina (1614). Helmont grew a willow tree and measured the amount of soil, the weight of the tree and the water he added. After five years the plant had gained about 164 lbs (74 kg). Since the amount of soil was nearly the same as it had been when he started his experiment (it lost only 57 grams), he deduced that the tree's weight gain had come entirely from water.

=== Spontaneous generation ===
Van Helmont described a recipe for the spontaneous generation of mice (a piece of dirty cloth plus wheat for 21 days) and scorpions (basil, placed between two bricks and left in sunlight). His notes suggest he may have attempted to do these things.

== Religious and philosophical opinions ==
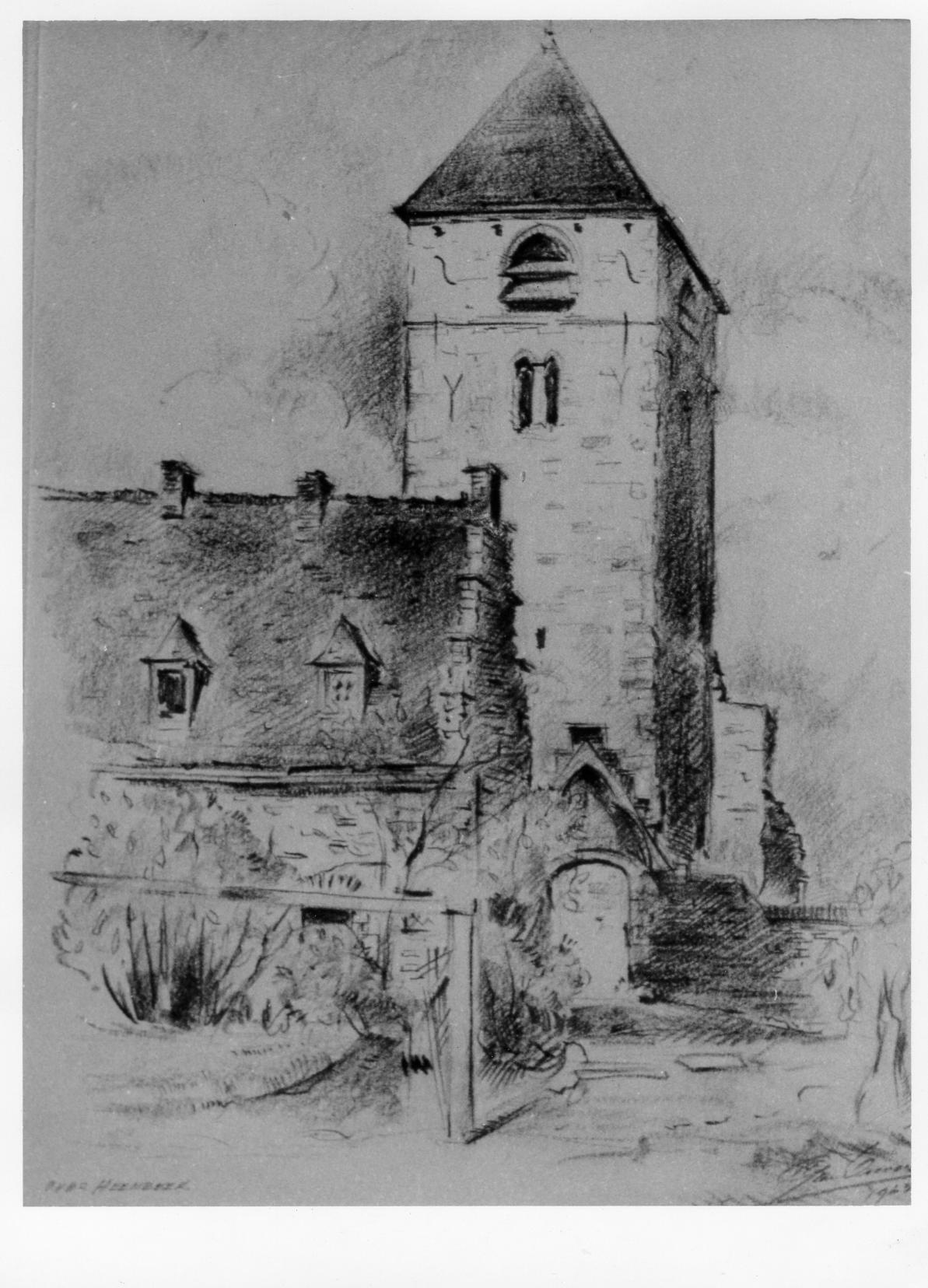
The Romanesque tower of the old church in Neder-Over-Heembeek and house where van Helmont performed an alchemical transmutation. Drawing by Leon Van Dievoet, 1963.

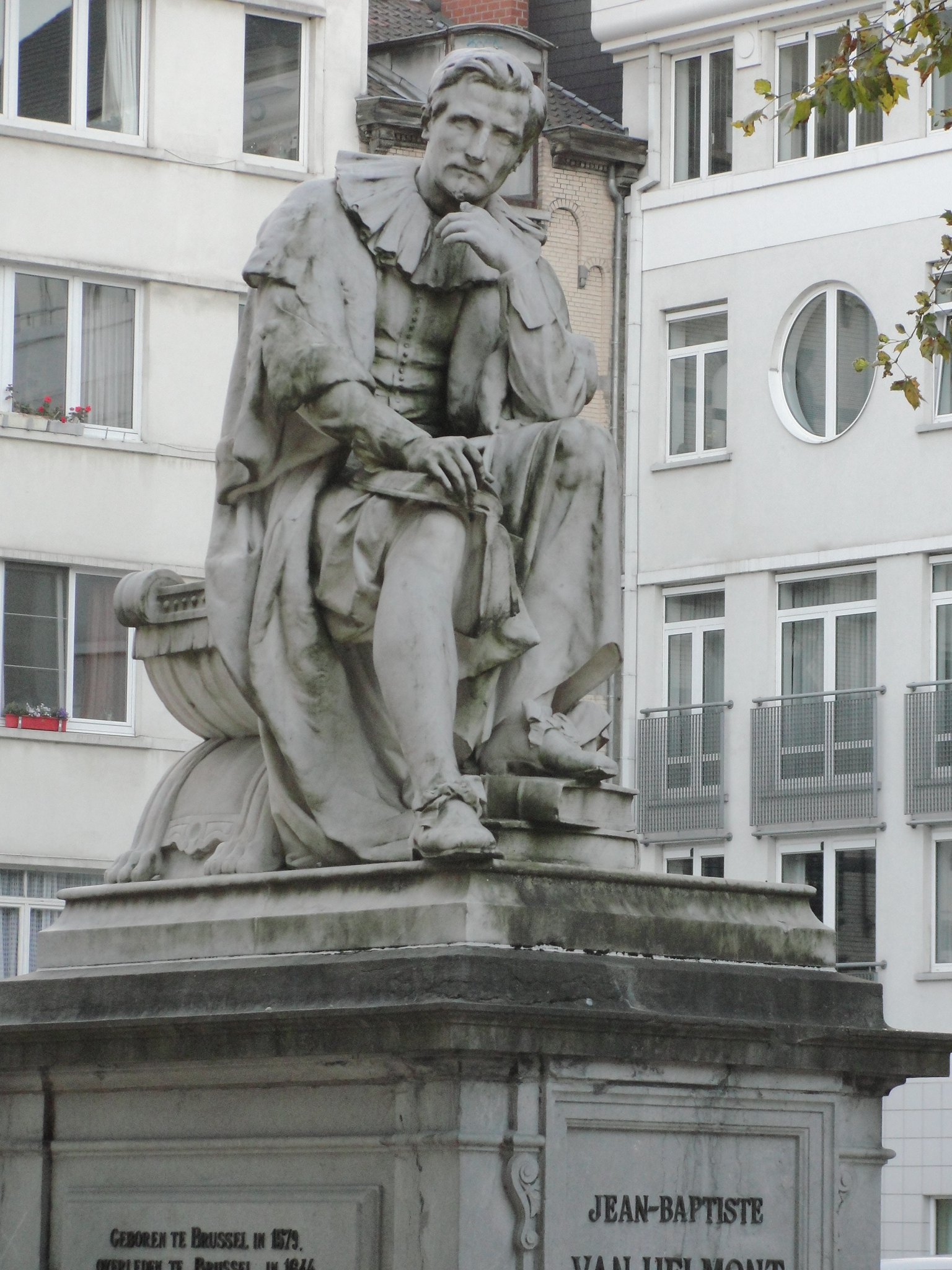
Monument for Jan Baptist van Helmont in Brussels

Although a faithful Catholic, he incurred the suspicion of the Church by his tract De magnetica vulnerum curatione (1621), against Jean Roberti, since he could not explain the effects of his 'miraculous cream'. The Jesuits therefore argued that Helmont used 'magic' and convinced the inquisition to scrutinize his writings. It was the lack of scientific evidence that drove Roberti to this step. His works were collected and edited by his son Franciscus Mercurius van Helmont and published by Lodewijk Elzevir in Amsterdam as Ortus medicinae, vel opera et opuscula omnia ("The Origin of Medicine, or Complete Works") in 1648. Ortus medicinae was based on, but not restricted to, the material of Dageraad ofte Nieuwe Opkomst der Geneeskunst ("Daybreak, or the New Rise of Medicine"), which was published in 1644 in Van Helmont's native Dutch. His son Frans's writings, Cabbalah Denudata (1677) and Opuscula philosophica (1690) are a mixture of theosophy, mysticism and alchemy.

Over and above the archeus, he believed that there is the sensitive soul which is the husk or shell of the immortal mind. Before the Fall the archeus obeyed the immortal mind and was directly controlled by it, but at the Fall men also received the sensitive soul and with it lost immortality, for when it perishes the immortal mind can no longer remain in the body.

Van Helmont described the archeus as "aura vitalis seminum, vitae directrix" ("The chief Workman [Archeus] consists of the conjoyning of the vitall air, as of the matter, with the seminal likeness, which is the more inward spiritual kernel, containing the fruitfulness of the Seed; but the visible Seed is onely the husk of this.").

In addition to the archeus, van Helmont believed in other governing agencies resembling the archeus which were not always clearly distinguished from it. From these he invented the term blas (motion), defined as the "vis motus tam alterivi quam localis" ("twofold motion, to wit, locall, and alterative"), that is, natural motion and motion that can be altered or voluntary. Of blas there were several kinds, e.g. blas humanum (blas of humans), blas of stars and blas meteoron (blas of meteors); of meteors he said "constare gas materiâ et blas efficiente" ("Meteors do consist of their matter Gas, and their efficient cause Blas, as well the Motive, as the altering").

Van Helmont "had frequent visions throughout his life and laid great stress upon them". His choice of a medical profession has been attributed to a conversation with the angel Raphael, and some of his writings described imagination as a celestial, and possibly magical, force. Though Van Helmont was skeptical of specific mystical theories and practices, he refused to discount magical forces as explanations for certain natural phenomena. This stance, reflected in a 1621 paper on sympathetic principles, may have contributed to his prosecution, and subsequent house arrest several years later, in 1634, which lasted a few weeks. The trial, however, never came to a conclusion. He was neither sentenced nor rehabilitated.

== Disputed portrait ==
In 2003, the historian Lisa Jardine proposed that a portrait held in the collections of the Natural History Museum, London, traditionally identified as John Ray, might represent Robert Hooke. Jardine's hypothesis was subsequently disproved by William B. Jensen of the University of Cincinnati and by the German researcher Andreas Pechtl of Johannes Gutenberg University of Mainz, who showed that the portrait in fact depicts van Helmont.

== Honours ==
In 1875, he was honoured by Belgian botanist Alfred Cogniaux (1841–1916), who named a genus of flowering plants from South America, Helmontia (from the Cucurbitaceae family).

== See also ==
- Franciscus Mercurius van Helmont, his son
- George Thomson (physician) (c. 1619–1676), English physician and notable advocate of Helmontian medicine
- Timeline of hydrogen technologies
- Pneumatic chemistry
