= Pneumatic trough =

Laboratory apparatus for trapping gases

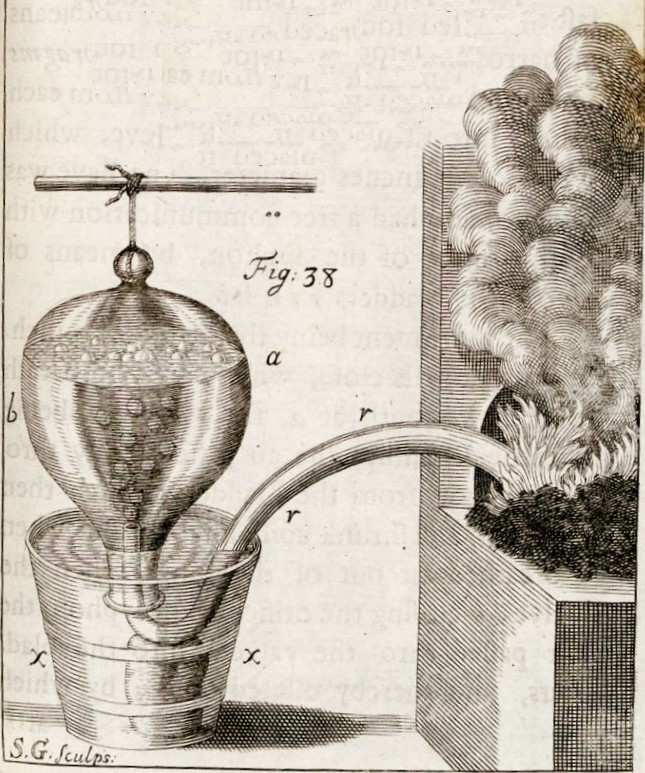
Pneumatic trough with bulb suspended from hanger, as invented by Stephen Hales

A pneumatic trough is a piece of laboratory apparatus used for collecting gases, such as hydrogen, oxygen and nitrogen. It is mainly made of glass or various fibres and are of various sizes. It was invented by Stephen Hales.

== Description ==
Four items are required for gas collection with a pneumatic trough:

- The trough itself, which is a large glass dish or a similar container.
- A gas bottle (or bulb), to hold the gas collected.
- A way to support the gas bottle or bulb, such as a beehive shelf or a hanger (as with Stephen Hales' design).
- A liquid in the trough.

=== Liquid ===
Pneumatic troughs require a liquid such as water. Scientists also have used mercury in pneumatic troughs, but usually only for the collection of water-soluble gases. Health and safety issues surrounding mercury generally prohibit its use in modern-day pneumatic troughs.

== Usage ==
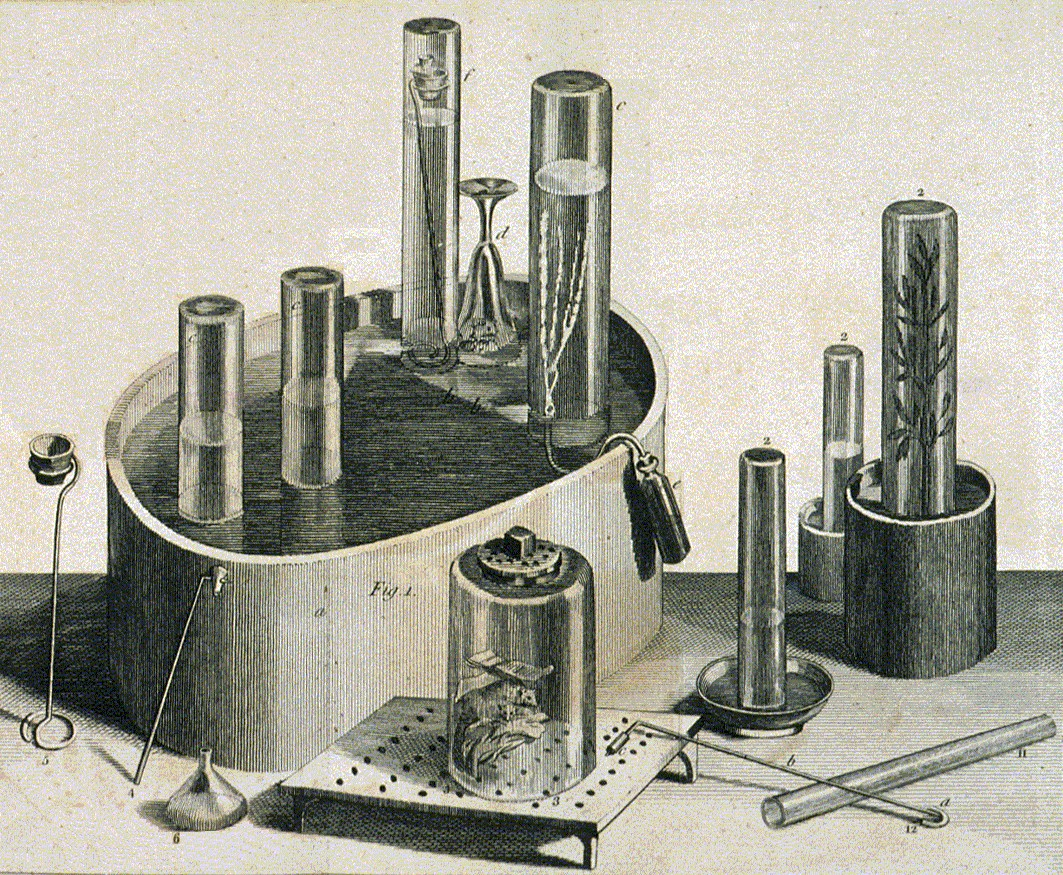
Pneumatic trough, and other equipment, used by Joseph Priestley

The bottle is filled with water, inverted, and placed into the pneumatic trough already containing water. The outlet tube from the gas-generating apparatus is inserted into the opening of the bottle so that gas can bubble up through it, displacing the water within.

== See also ==
- Eudiometer
- Pneumatic chemistry
- Joseph Priestley
