= John Heydon (astrologer) =

English Neoplatonist occult philosopher, Rosicrucian, astrologer and attorney

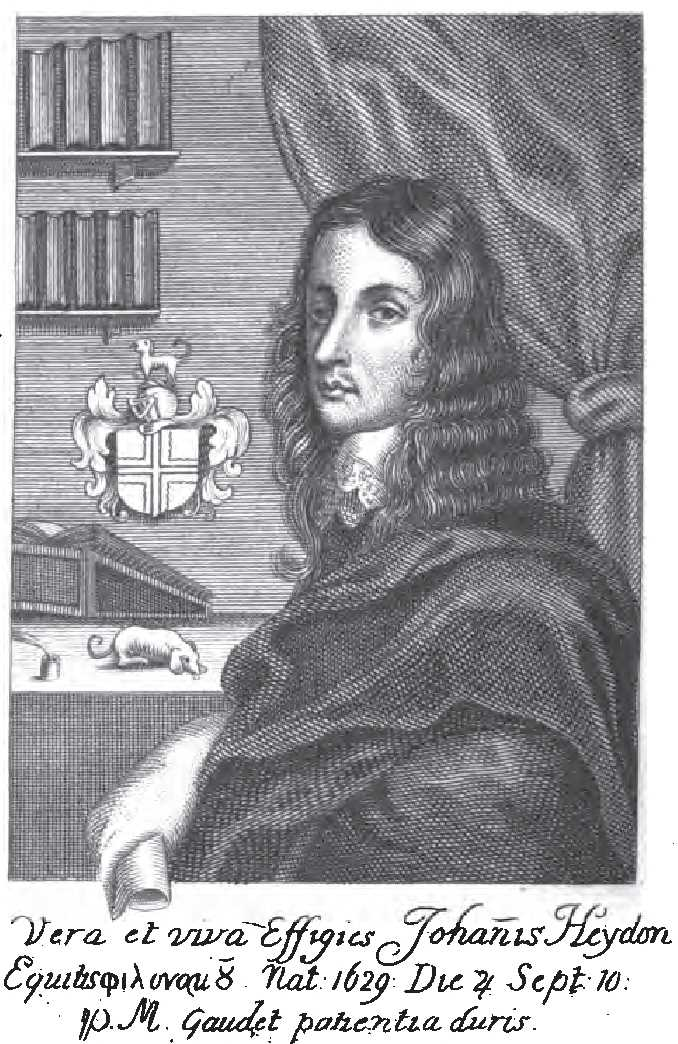
Portrait, (engraved by Thomas Cross)

John Heydon (10 September 1629 – c. 1667) was an English Neoplatonist occult philosopher, Rosicrucian, astrologer and attorney.

== Life ==
Rosicrucian sources, including Heydon's own English Physician's Guide and Frederick Talbot's The Wise Man's Crown, give a florid biography for Heydon, including a claim to be descended from a King of Hungary. However, he was actually born in "Green Arbour" (near the Old Bailey), London, the son of Francis Heydon (of Sidmouth in Devonshire) and Mary (née Chandler, of Worcestershire). He was baptised at St. Sepulchre's Church. He had one sibling, a sister, Anne, two years his junior.

According to his own account, he was educated at Tardebigge, Worcestershire, among his mother's friends. He studied Latin and Greek with a tutor and was apprenticed to the study of law; however, his studies were interrupted by the outbreak of the English Civil War, and as a young man, he was said to have served in the royalist army. In 1651 he went abroad, travelling to Italy, Spain, Egypt, Arabia, and Persia.

On returning to England, he trained in law, and was articled as a clerk in 1652. In 1655, he was living in Clifford's Inn, practising as an attorney and also casting horoscopes. Heydon married the widow of Nicholas Culpeper in 1656, and is thought to have fathered a daughter. After 1658, he lived in "Spitalfields, near Bishopsgate, next to the "Red Lion".

He attracted attention in royalist and occultist circles for predicting the future, including the death of Oliver Cromwell, then Protector. Their royalist connections caused both Francis and John Heydon to be imprisoned in the final years of the Commonwealth era. The Restoration of 1660 resolved Heydon's incarceration – though he was imprisoned briefly later in 1663 for dealing in suspect (treasonous) literature, and in 1664 for debt.

In 1665, Heydon published "Psonthonphanchia, or a Quintuple Rosiecrucian Scourge for the due Correction of that Pseudo-chymist and Scurrilous Emperick, Geo. Thomson", a fierce response to a pamphlet issued by physician George Thomson criticising the conduct of those members of the Royal College of Physicians who left the city during the Great Plague of London of 1665–66.

In 1667, Heydon was imprisoned, again, in the Tower of London for his part in the treasonous plots of his patron, the Duke of Buckingham. He was accused of "treasonable practices in sowing sedition in the navy and engaging persons in a conspiracy to seize the Tower". He claimed however, that he was innocent and was the victim of someone paid to inform against him.

Heydon was accused of plagiarising Sir Thomas Browne, Thomas Vaughan, and other writers; his Physician's Guide of 1662 largely derives from Sir Francis Bacon's New Atlantis. He was referred to as "an ignoramus and a cheate" by Elias Ashmole; Frances Yates termed him a "strange character...an astrologer, geomancer, alchemist, of a most extreme type."; while A. E. Waite considered that all that was of value in his mysticism was derived from anterior writers.

The precise date of Heydon's death is unknown.

== Works ==
Heydon published a remarkable volume of work in the last twelve years of his life. A complete list can be found in the "Dictionary of National Biography" (1885–1900) entry (see "references" below), but includes:

- Eugenius Theodidactus, the Prophetical Trumpeter... (1655)
- A New Method of Rosie Crucian Physick... (1658)
- The Rosie Crucian Infallible Axiomata; or, generall rules to know all things past, present, and to come (1660)
- The Harmony of the World... (1662)
- The English Physitians Guide: or a Holy Guide (1662)
- Theomagia, or the temple of wisdom in three parts, spiritual, celestial, and elemental: containing the occult powers of the angels of astromancy in the telesmatical sculpture of the Persians and Ægyptians: the mysterious vertues of the characters of the stars...the knowledge of the Rosie Crucian physick, and the miraculous secrets of nature... (three parts, 1662/4)
- Psonthonpanchia... (1664)
- The wise-mans crown, or, The glory of the rosie-cross
- Elhavarevna; or, the English Physitian's Tutor in the Astrobolismes of Metals Rosie Crucian (1665).
