= George Thomson (physician) =

English physician, medical writer and pamphleteer

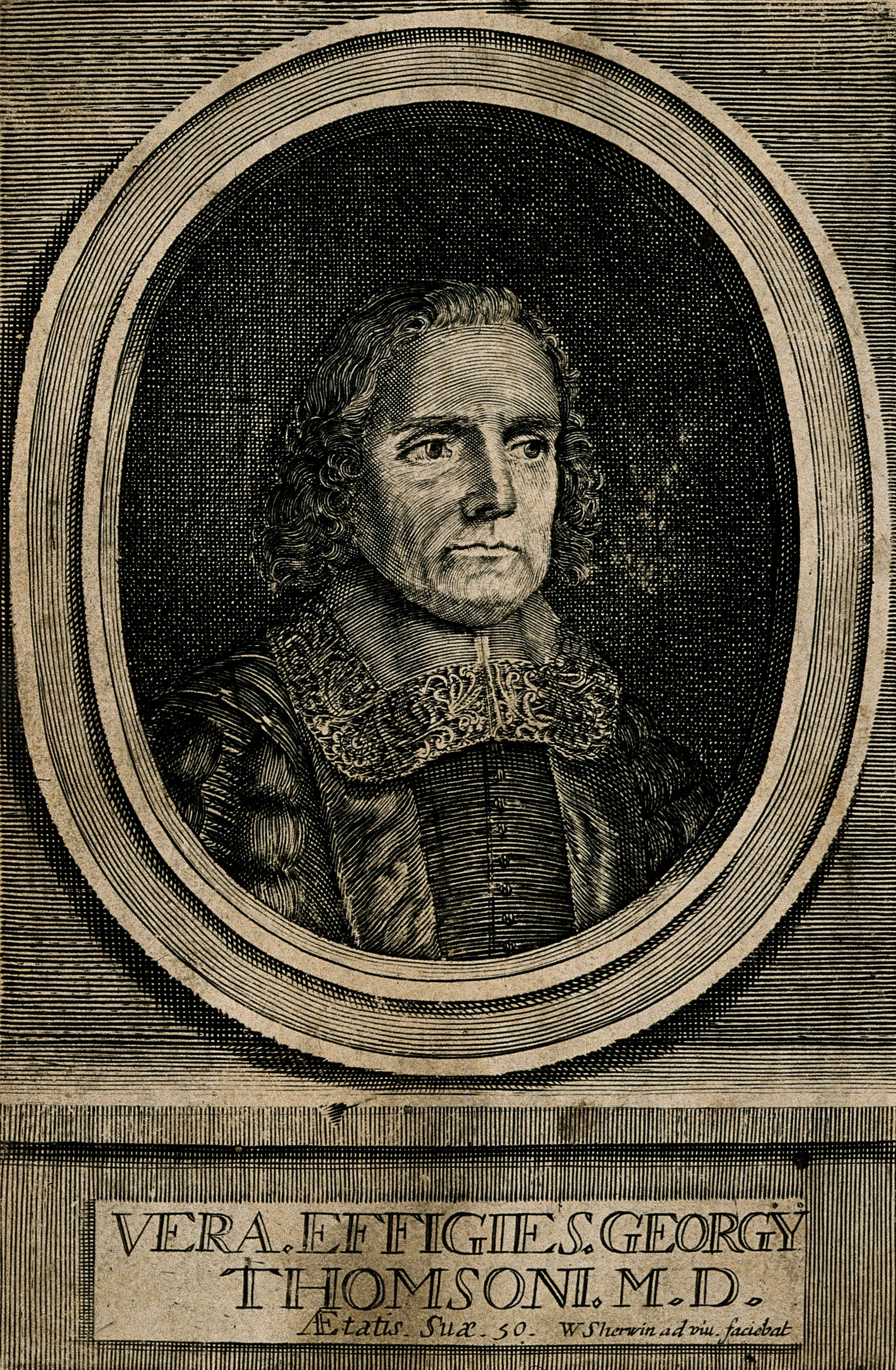
George Thomson. Line engraving by W. Sherwin, 1670, after hi Wellcome V0005811

George Thomson (c. 1619–1676) was an English physician, medical writer and pamphleteer. He was a leading figure in an attempt to create a "College of Chemical Physicians", a rival to the established Royal College of Physicians. He rejected the traditional Galenic approach to medicine and argued against medical bloodletting, purging and the doctrine of curing by "contraries". He performed a splenectomy on a dog which stimulated debate in scientific and medical circles, and challenged prevailing medical theories about the body.

== Life and work ==
Thomson was born around 1619, and served under Prince Maurice in the English Civil War; he was taken prisoner by the parliamentarians at Newbury in 1644 and spent a period in Fleet prison in London. On his release he attempted to obtain a license from the College of Physicians, but finding the licensing charge too excessive, went on to obtain his M.D. from Leyden University (in the Netherlands) instead, graduating on 15 June 1648; the thesis he submitted for this purpose was "Disputatio de Apoplexia" (Leyden, 1648). He subsequently rejected Galenic medicine, becoming a strong supporter of the ideas of Jan Baptist van Helmont (Helmontian medicine).

Around 1656, he performed a splenectomy on a dog, successfully keeping the animal alive afterwards for more than 2 years. This challenged the prevailing humoralist theory of the body, and attracted the attention of physicians and scientists in London, including William Harvey and Robert Boyle. During the great plague of 1665 he lived in London, and made a special study of the symptoms, even dissecting the body of a plague victim. In 1665 he published "Loimologia: a Consolatory Advice, and some brief Observations concerning the present Pest", in which he reflected on the conduct of those members of the Royal College of Physicians who left the city during the plague. He accused them of running away and "leaving this great city destitute of their help, when it most needed it". This pamphlet drew a furious reply from John Heydon entitled "Psonthonphanchia, or a Quintuple Rosiecrucian Scourge for the due Correction of that Pseudo-chymist and Scurrilous Emperick, Geo. Thomson" (London, 1665).

In 1665, Thomson also published "Galeno-pale, or a chymical Trial of the Galenists, that their Dross in Physick may be discovered", in which he protested against the contempt of English medical practitioners for experience, and their implicit reliance on theory. He also argued strongly against the excessive Bloodletting and purging in vogue, and against the method of attempting to cure diseases by contraries. This drew a reply by William Johnson, entitled "Agyrto-mastik Or, some brief animadversions upon two late treatises: one of Master George Thomsons, entituled Galeno-Pale etc."(London, 1665), which was published, together with a eulogy of "Galeno-pale", by George Starkey. In the following year Thomson pursued the subject in ‘Loimotomia, or the Pest anatomised’.

In 1670 Thomson published a treatise against blood-letting under the title of "Haimatiasis, or the true Way of preserving the Bloud", which plunged him into a new controversy with Henry Stubbe (1631–1676), who replied in "The Lord Bacon's Relation of the Sweating-Sickness examined, in a Reply to George Thomson, Pretender to Physick and Chymistry, together with a Defence of Phlebotomy" (London, 1671). Thomson rejoined in "A check given to the insolent garrulity of Henry Stubbe etc." (London, 1671). Letters were exchanged and published by Thomson in the following year. In 1673, he published "Epilogismi Chymici Observationes necnon Remedia Hermetica Longa in Arte Hiatrica exercitatione constabilita", and, in 1675, "The direct method of curing chymically etc".

Thomson was married twice: first, on 2 November 1667, to Abigail, daughter of Hugh Nettleshipp, salter, of Wandsworth, Surrey; and secondly, on 31 October 1672, to Martha Bathurst of Battersea, Surrey.

Thomson's portrait, engraved from life in 1670 by William Sherwin, is prefixed to several of his works.
