= Stephen Hales =

English clergyman and scientist (1677–1761)

The Reverend Stephen Hales
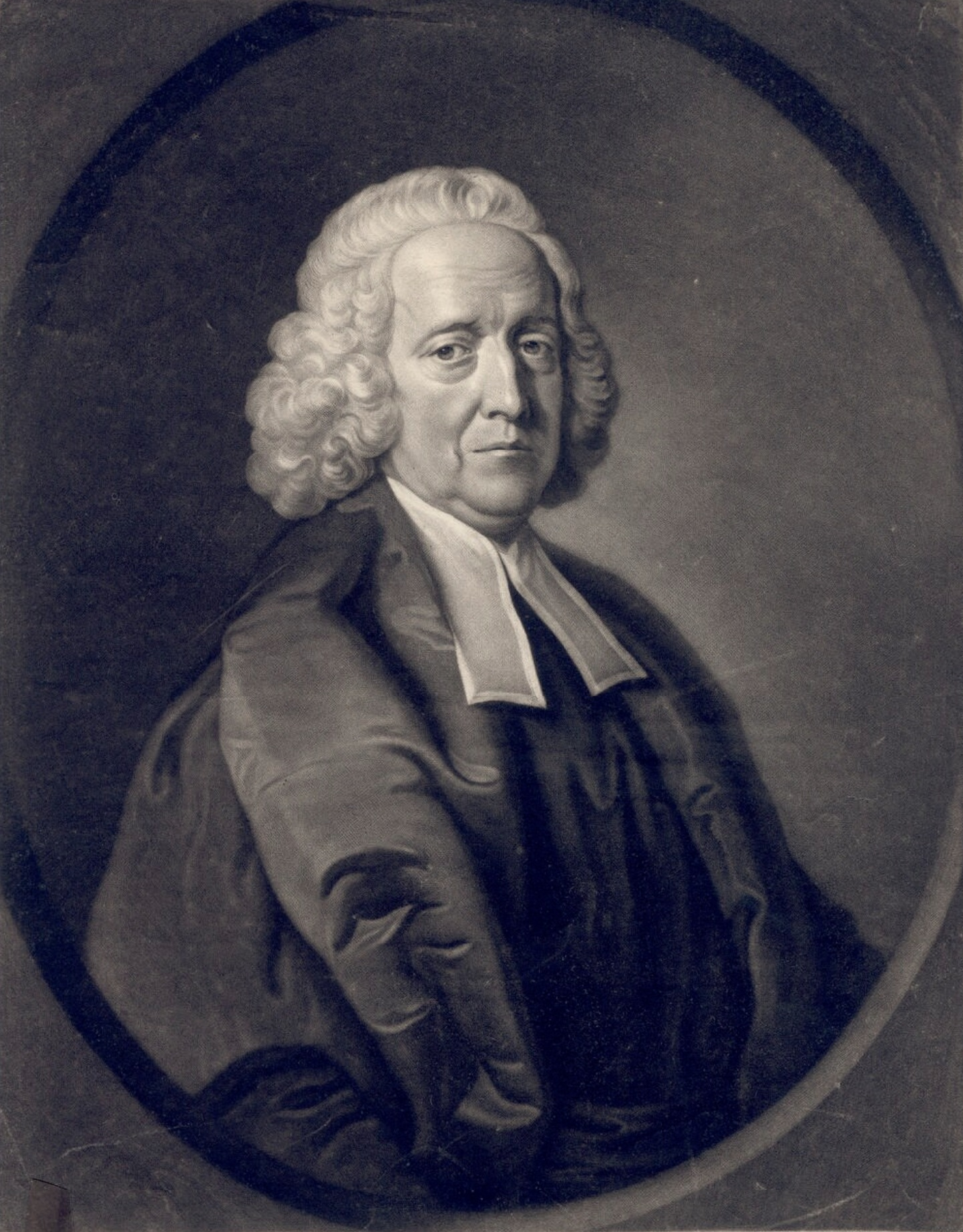
- Mezzotint by James MacArdell after a Thomas Hudson portrait, c. 1759
- Born: 17 September 1677; Bekesbourne, England
- Died: 4 January 1761 (aged 83); Teddington, England
- Awards: Copley Medal (1739)
- Scientific career
- Fields: Plant physiology; Chemistry; Physiology

Stephen Hales (17 September 1677 – 4 January 1761) was an English clergyman who made major contributions to a range of scientific fields including botany, pneumatic chemistry and physiology. He was the first person to measure blood pressure. He also invented several devices, including a ventilator, a pneumatic trough and a surgical forceps for the removal of bladder stones. In addition to these achievements, he was a philanthropist and wrote a popular tract on alcoholic intemperance.

== Life ==
Stephen Hales was born in Bekesbourne, Kent, England. He was the sixth son of Thomas Hales, heir to Baronetcy of Beakesbourne and Brymore, and his wife, Mary (née Wood), and was one of twelve or possibly thirteen children. Thomas Hales (died 1692) predeceased his father, Sir Robert Hales; therefore Sir Robert's grandson, Thomas Hales (Stephen Hales's brother) succeeded to the baronetcy in December 1693.

Hales was educated in Kensington and then at Orpington before attending Corpus Christi College, Cambridge, then known as St Benedict's, in 1696. Although he was an ordinand studying divinity, Hales would have received his degree in the Classics, mathematics, natural sciences and philosophy while in Cambridge. Hales was admitted as a Fellow of Corpus Christi in 1703, the same year as he obtained the degree of Master of Arts, and was ordained as deacon at Bugden, Huntingdonshire. He continued his theological and other studies in Cambridge, where he became friends with William Stukeley who was studying medicine. He attended chemistry lectures by Giovanni Francisco Vigani while at Cambridge. His interest in biology, botany and physiology is presumed to date from that time.

In 1709 he was ordained priest at Fulham and on 10 August 1709 he was appointed perpetual curate of the parish of Teddington, Middlesex, and left Cambridge, although he retained his Fellowship until 1718. He became a Bachelor of Divinity in 1711. Hales remained in Teddington for the rest of his life, except for occasional visits to his other parishes. He was an assiduous minister – in addition to parish duties he enlarged and repaired the parish church and commissioned a new water supply for the village – and well regarded although there is some evidence that his experimental work on animal physiology was viewed with misgivings. Thomas Twining included a verse in his poem "The Boat on Hales":

Green Teddington's serene retreat
For Philosophic studies meet,
Where the good Pastor Stephen Hales
Weighed moisture in a pair of scales,
To lingering death put Mares and Dogs,
And stripped the Skins from living Frogs,
Nature, he loved, her Works intent
To search or sometimes to torment.

In 1718, the poet Alexander Pope, a renowned dog lover, also criticized Hales's work. In conversation with his friend, Joseph Spence, Pope reportedly said of Hales: "He commits most of these barbarities with the thought of its being of use to man. But how do we know that we have a right to kill creatures that we are so little above as dogs, for our curiosity, or even for some use to us?". Pope, however was also a close friend of Hales and considered him the model of the man who loves his God.

In 1718 Hales was elected a fellow of the Royal Society and in the same year became rector of Porlock, Somerset, a post he held alongside the curacy of Teddington.

In 1720 he married Mary Newce, but she died the following year, probably in childbirth; there were no children and he never remarried. In 1723 he was installed as rector of Farringdon, Hampshire (which he held alongside Teddington by employing a curate in Farringdon). Hales spent his summers there and became a friend of Gilbert White, the naturalist, whose family lived nearby.

Hales's fame as a scientist grew from 1718 onwards, and by the mid part of the 18th century he had achieved an international reputation. He was one of the eight Foreign Members of the Royal Academy of Sciences, Paris, and was elected a member of the Academy of Sciences of Bologna. He received the Copley Medal in 1739 and also became a public figure as a result of his campaigns against the gin trade and his involvement in the Georgia Trust. He was made a Doctor of Divinity by Oxford University in 1733.

In his later years he received frequent visits from Frederick, Prince of Wales, and his wife, Princess Augusta of Saxe-Gotha, both of whom were interested in gardening and botany. He gave Princess Augusta advice on the development of Kew Gardens, and in 1751 he was appointed Clerk of the Closet to the Princess Dowager, following the death of Prince Frederick, a post he held until his death.

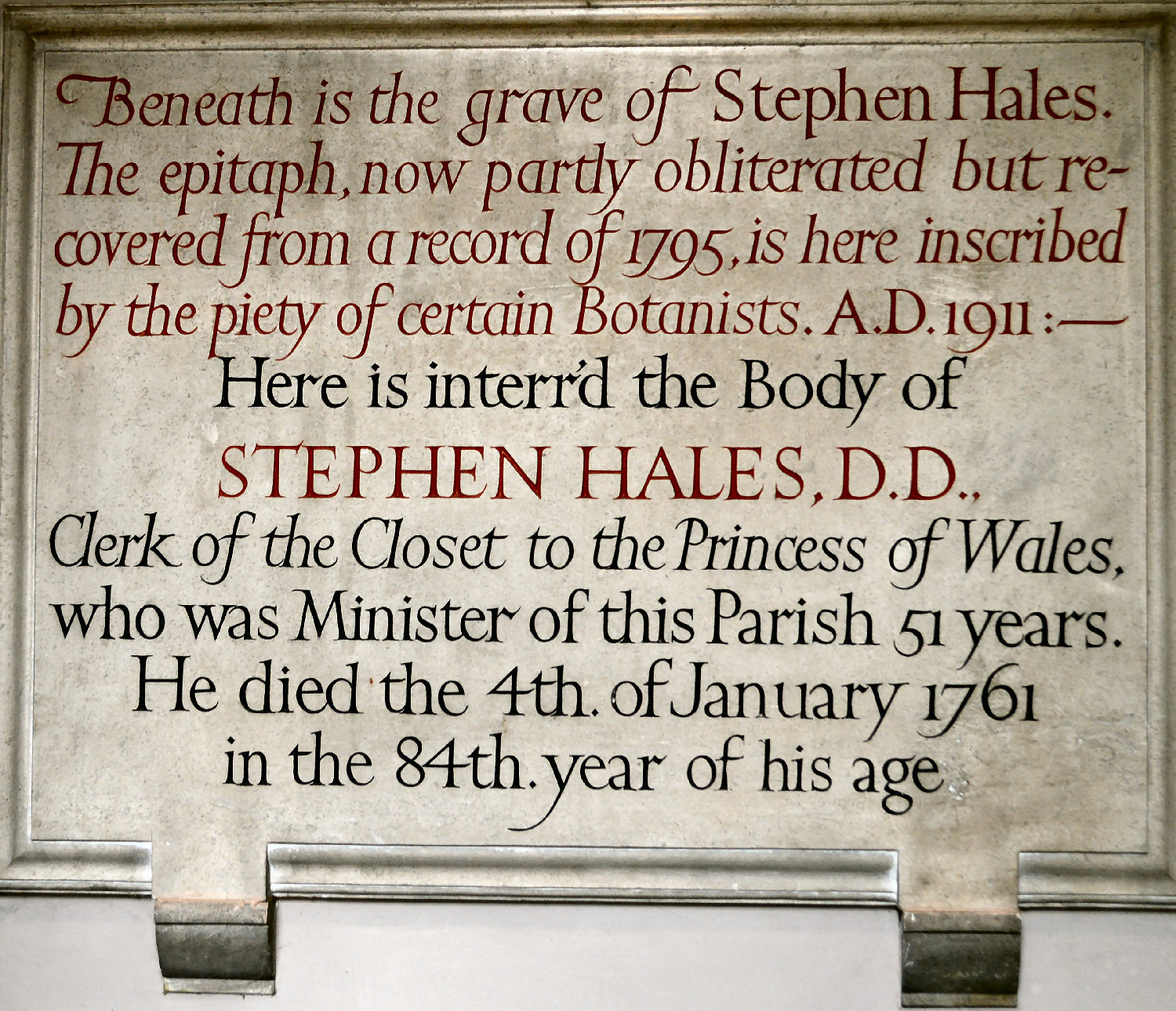
Monument for Stephen Hales at St Mary's Church, Teddington

At the age of seventy Hales was chosen by the president and fellows of the Royal College of Physicians to preach the annual Crounian Sermon in the church of St Mary-le-Bow. He selected his favorite topic – "The Wisdom and Goodness of God in the formation of Man". Hales died in his 84th year at Teddington on 4 January 1761 after a short illness. At his own request he was buried under the tower of the church where he had worked for so many years. A monument to Hales was raised by Princess Augusta in the south transept of Westminster Abbey after his death.

== Work ==
Hales is best known for his Statical Essays. The first volume, Vegetable Staticks (1727), contains an account of experiments in plant physiology and chemistry; it was translated into French by Georges-Louis Leclerc, Comte de Buffon in 1735 and into Italian by Maria Angela Ardinghelli in Naples in 1750–1752. The second volume, Haemastaticks (1733), describes experiments on animal physiology including the measurement of the "force of the blood", i.e. blood pressure. Translated and annotated by Ardinghelli in 1756.

=== Plant physiology and the chemistry of air ===
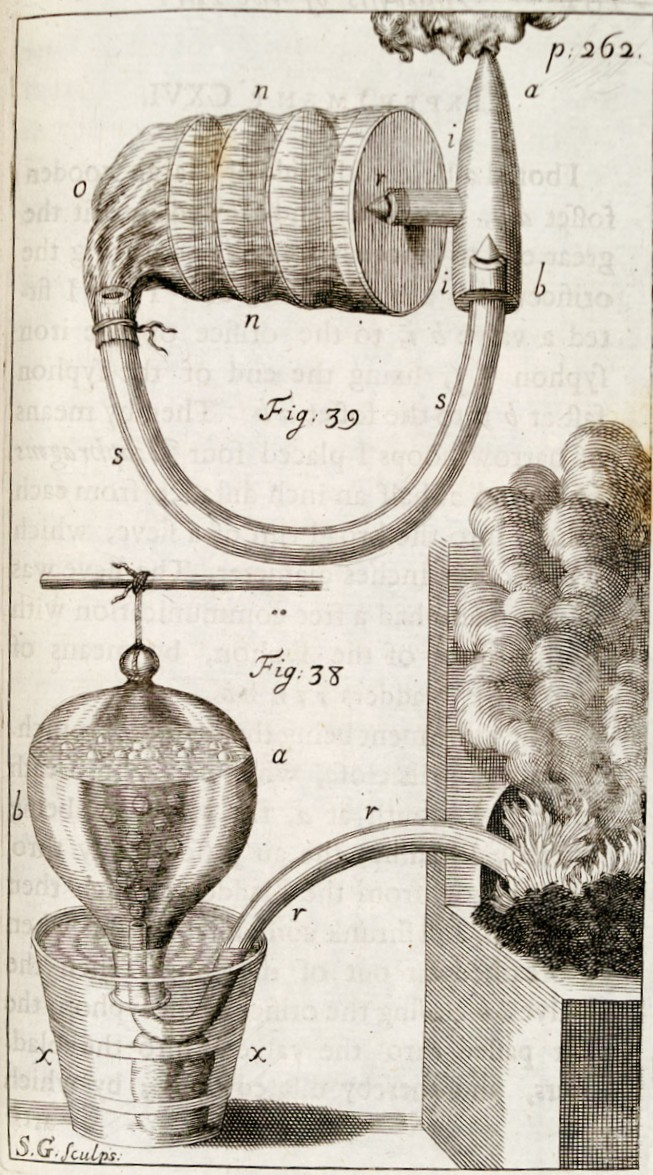
From Vegetable Staticks, opposite page 262

In Vegetable Staticks, Hales studied transpiration – the loss of water from the leaves of plants. He estimated the surface area of the leaves of the plant and the length and surface area of the roots. This allowed Hales to compare the calculated influx of water into the plant with the amount of water leaving the plant by transpiration through the leaves. He also measured 'the force of the sap' or root pressure. Hales commented that "plants very probably draw through their leaves some part of their nourishment from the air". In Vegetable Staticks Hales prefigured the cohesion theory of water movement in plants, although his ideas were not understood at the time, so he did not influence the debate on water transport in plants in the 19th century. He also speculated that plants might use light as a source of energy for growth (i.e. photosynthesis), based on Isaac Newton's suggestion that "gross bodies and light" might be interconvertible.

In Vegetable Staticks Hales also described experiments that showed that "... air freely enters plants, not only with the principal fund of nourishment by the roots, but also thro' the surface of their trunks and leaves". While Hales's work on the chemistry of air appears primitive by modern standards, its importance was acknowledged by Antoine Lavoisier, the discoverer of oxygen. Hales's invention of the pneumatic trough to collect gases over water is also considered a major technical advance. Modified forms of the pneumatic trough were later used by William Brownrigg, Henry Cavendish and Joseph Priestley in their research.

=== Animal physiology ===
Hales began his work on animal physiology with William Stuckeley while in Cambridge, although much of it was published only after Vegetable Staticks appeared. Hales and Stuckeley performed a wide range of studies including making casts of the trachea and bronchial trees of dogs using molten lead and measuring the water lost due to breathing. Most famously, Hales made measurements of blood pressure in several animal species by inserting fine tubes into arteries and measuring the height to which the column of blood rose. Hales also described the effects of hemorrhage and hemorrhagic shock by progressive exsanguination of animals and accompanying measurement of blood pressure. In a horse he observed that as death approached "the Mare fell into cold and clammy sweats". In addition, Hales took wax casts of the ventricle of the heart and estimated how much blood was pumped by the heart; correctly described the roles of the mitral valve and aortic valve during systole and diastole; explained the pulsations of arteries in terms of their elasticity and attributed the resistance to blood flow to friction due to the passage of blood through small blood vessels.

Hales also described a diverse range of work in Haemastaticks including his attempts to find substances that could be used to dissolve bladder stones or calculi. This aim was unsuccessful but as part of this work he developed a double lumen bladder catheter and devised special forceps to enable the removal of urinary stones.

Hales's work on the growth pattern of long bones, demonstrating epiphyseal growth; his demonstration of spinal reflexes in the frog and his suggestion that electricity played a role in allowing nerves to control muscle function are also noteworthy.

=== Inventions and other work ===
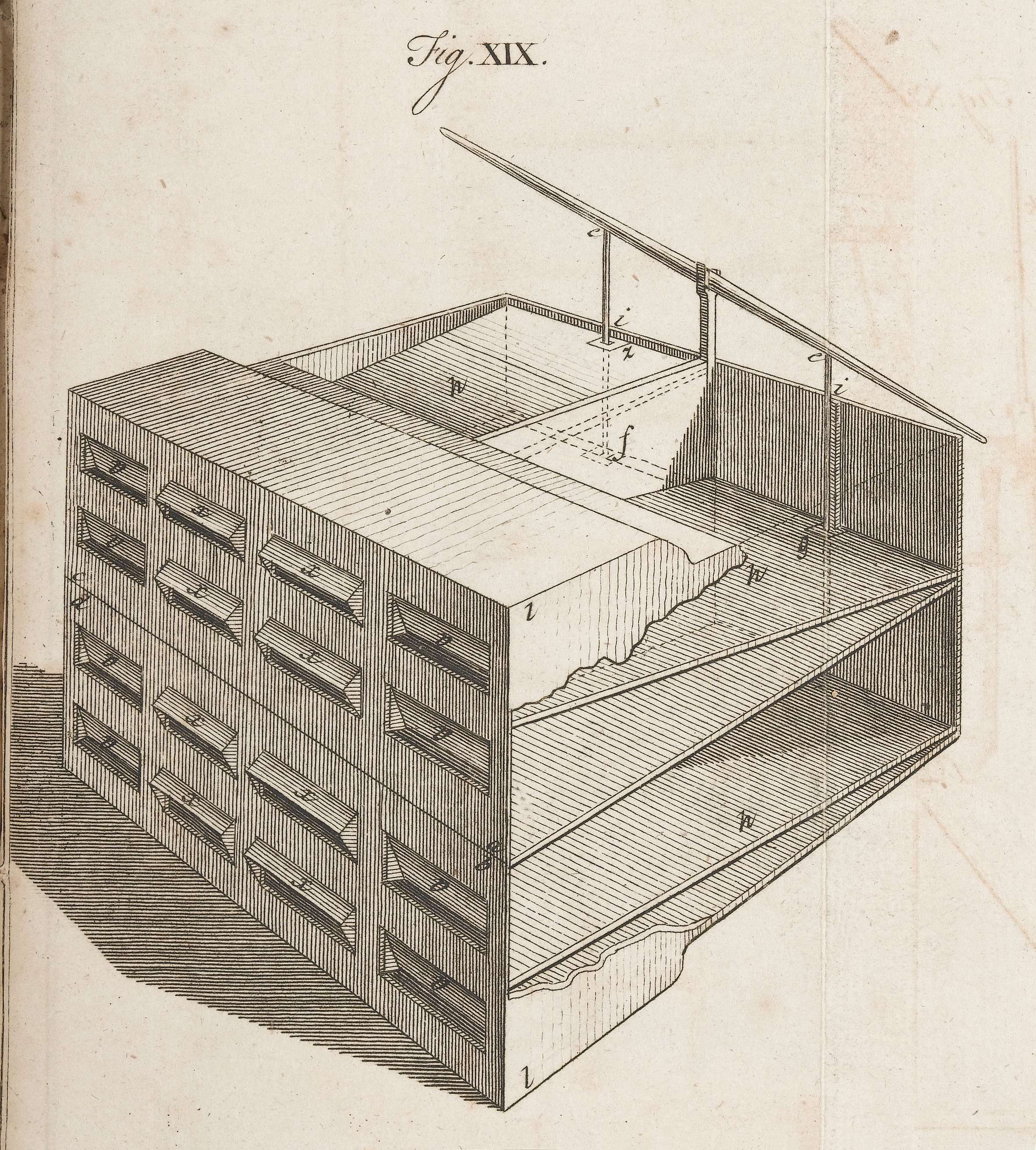
Image of a Ventilation Bellows devised by Stephen Hales

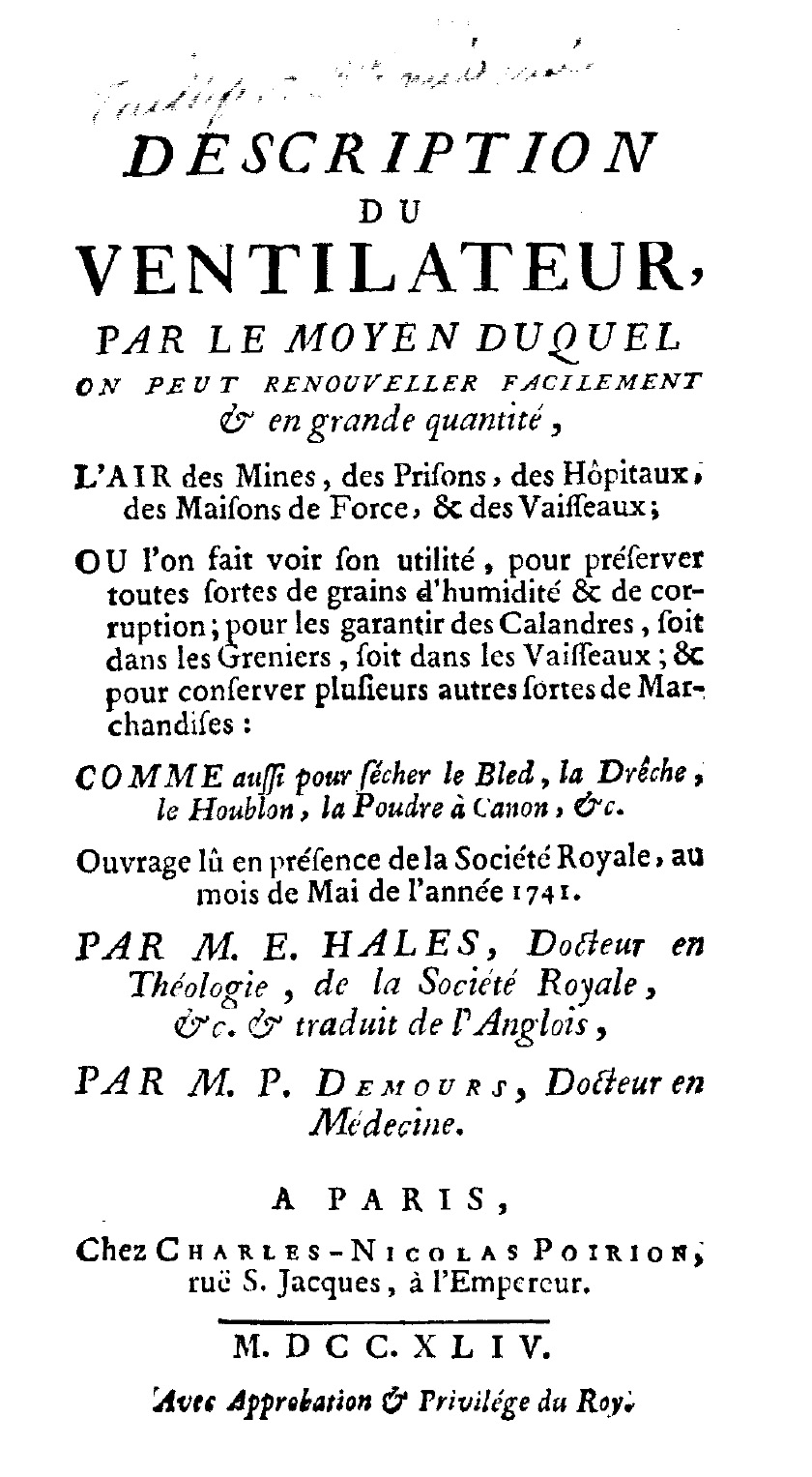
Description du ventilateur (French edition of Description of ventilators), 1744

Bad air was thought to be a cause of ill-health and death in the 18th century. Death and disease were common in overcrowded ships and prisons. Hales was one of several people in the early 18th century (other notable inventors being John Theophilus Desaguliers, Mårten Triewald and Samuel Sutton) who developed forms of ventilators to improve air quality. Hales's ventilators were large bellows, usually worked by hand, although larger versions were powered by windmills. They were widely installed in ships, prisons and mines and were successful in reducing disease, and aerating the lower decks of Royal Navy vessels to combat dry rot in the hulls. Hales's ventilators were also used in preserving foods and drying grain.

Hales also experimented with ways of distilling fresh water from sea water; preserving water and meat on sea-voyages; measuring depths at sea; measuring high temperatures; and wrote on a range of subjects including earthquakes; methods of preventing the spread of fires; and comparative mortality rates in relationship to rural and urban parishes.

=== Philanthropy ===
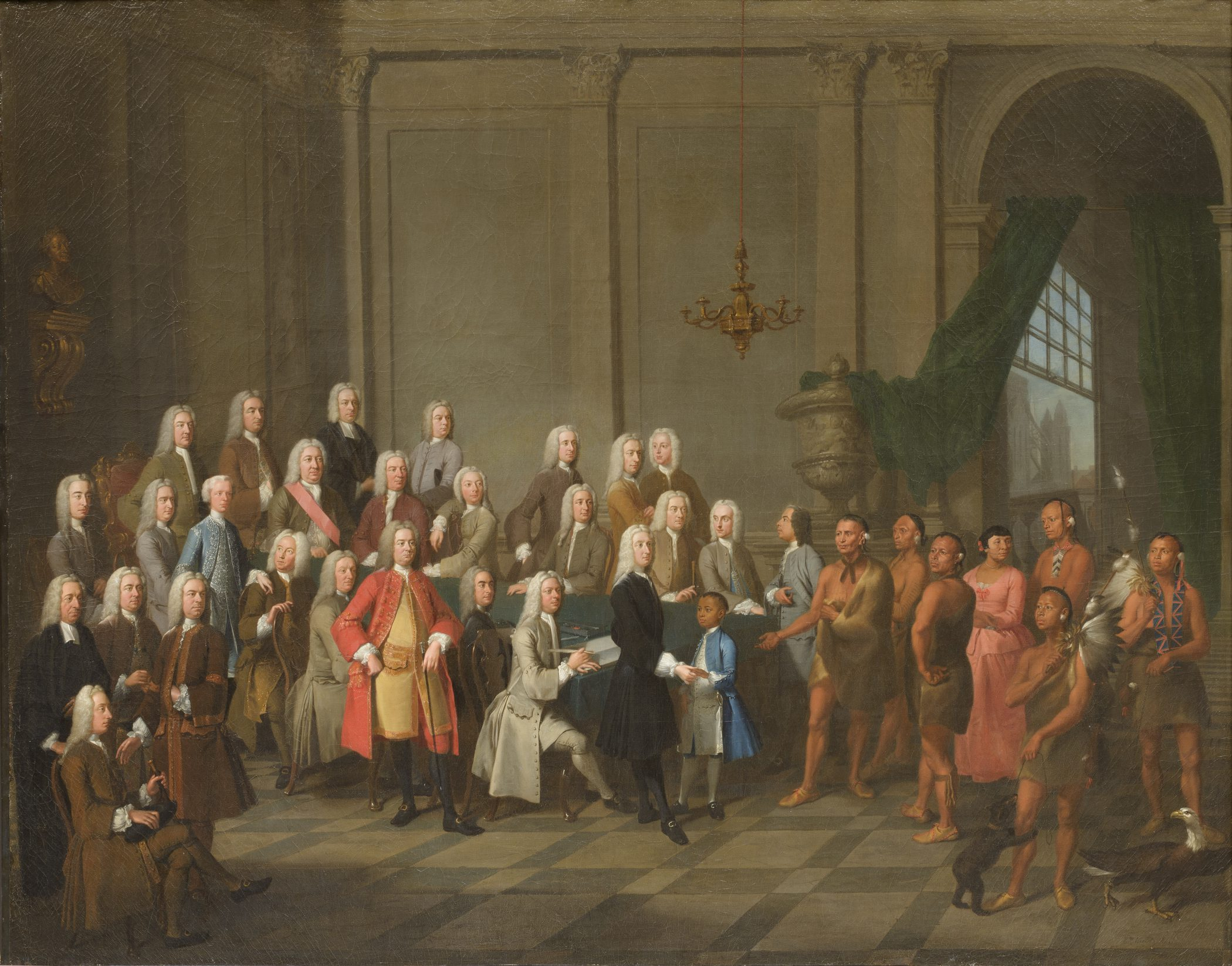
Audience Given by the Trustees of Georgia to a Delegation of Creek Indians. Hales is shown standing on the extreme left behind a chair.

After the death of his wife, Hales became increasingly involved in philanthropic causes. In 1722 he became a corresponding member of the Society for Promoting Christian Knowledge, founded by Thomas Bray. In 1723 Bray became ill and appointed trustees, including Hales, to administer a bequest from Abel Tassin, Sieur d’Allone for 'The Conversion of Negroes Slaves in the West Indies'. Subsequently, Hales was also appointed a trustee for Bray's legacy for establishing parochial libraries in the American colonies. These charities became incorporated into a scheme led by James Oglethorpe to establish a charitable colony for the poor, 'honest industrious debtors' and persecuted (Protestant) foreigners. Hales may well have felt a personal commitment to this scheme since his brothers had been imprisoned for debt following the failure of the South Sea Company and one, William, died of Gaol Fever in Newgate Prison.

In 1732 George II of Great Britain granted a charter for the foundation of the Province of Georgia and Hales was one of the 21 members of the Trustees for the Establishment of the Colony of Georgia in America. The colony of Georgia was notable for its prohibition of slavery and rum. As a result of his membership in the trustees, Hales learnt of the problems resulting from overcrowding of ships and this spurred him to invent a ship ventilator and undertake experiments to distil fresh water from sea water and to use salt to preserve meat on board ship.

Hales was one of the co-founders of the Society for the Encouragement of Arts, Manufactures and Commerce (later the Royal Society of Arts) conceived by William Shipley. Hales was also active in the movement to promote the Gin Act 1736. He wrote anonymous tracts against the consumption of gin and distilled spirits, most notably "A Friendly Admonition to the Drinker of Brandy and other Distilled Spirituous Liquors" and also lobbied Parliament. Hales was not opposed to all alcoholic beverages but felt strongly that spirits, and gin in particular, were as he termed it "the Bane of the Nation".

== Legacy ==
The genus of trees Halesia was named after him by John Ellis in 1759. The American Society of Plant Biologists awards the Stephen Hales Prize annually to a scientist for work in plant biology.

== Publications ==
- Description of ventilators (in French). Paris: Charles-Nicolas Poirion. 1744.
- Account of a useful discovery to distill double the usual quantity of sea-water, by blowing showers of air up through the distilling liquor. Londone: Richard Manby. 1756.

== See also ==
- Pneumatic chemistry
- Physiology
- Botany
- History of botany
