= Marsilio Landriani =

Italian chemist, physicist, and meteorologist

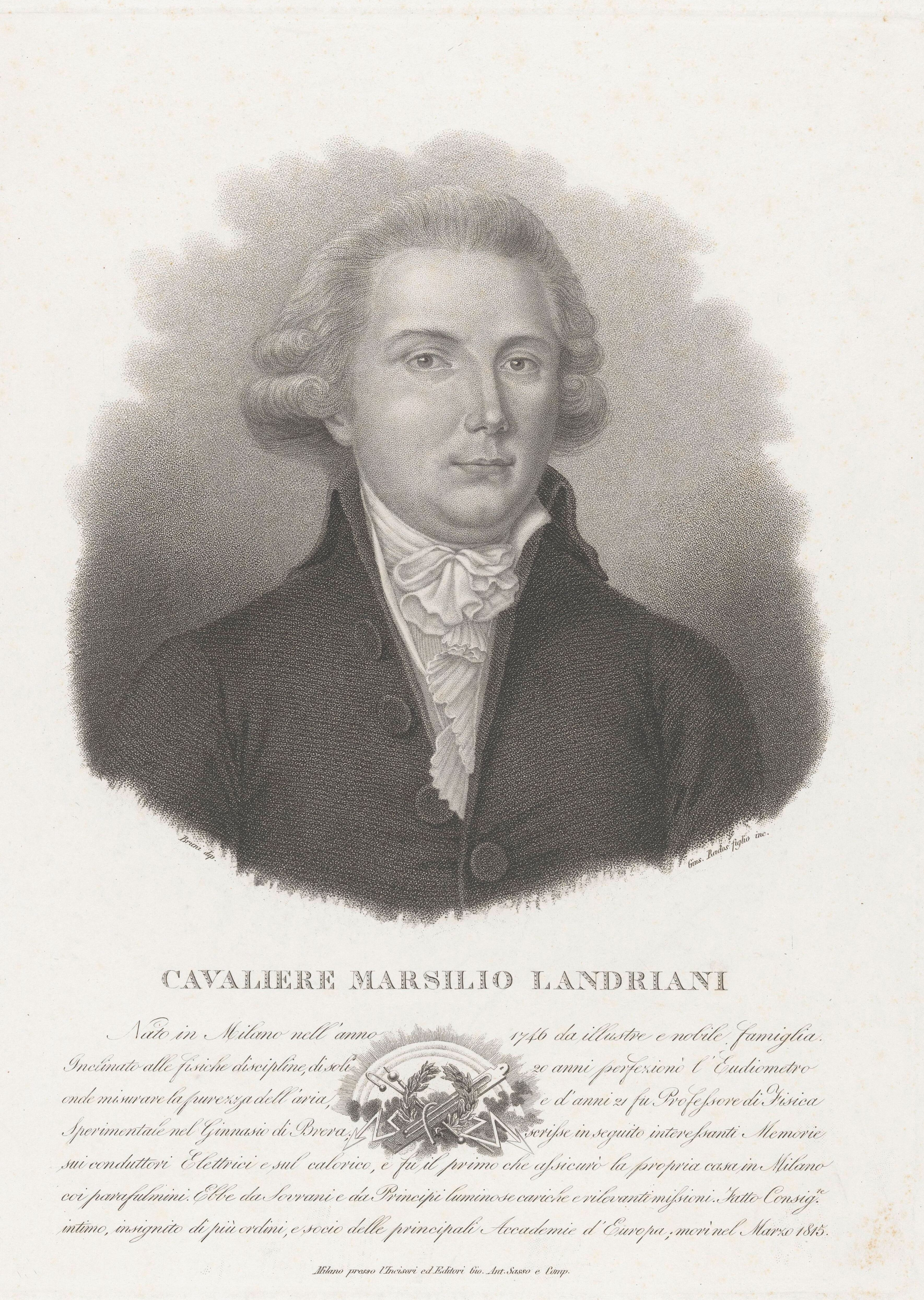
- Stipple engraving by G. Rados, junior
- Born: 1 October 1751; Milan, Duchy of Milan
- Died: 13 March 1815 (aged 63); Vienna, Austrian Empire
- Occupations: Chemist; Physicist; Meteorologist
- Known for: Invention of the eudiometer
- Scientific career
- Fields: Chemistry

Marsilio Landriani (1 October 1751 – 13 March 1815) was an Italian chemist, physicist and meteorologist. Landriani is best known as the inventor of the eudiometer. He endorsed the advantages of the lightning rod and helped to popularise Franklin’s scientific reputation in Italy.

== Biography ==
He became known with his first book, Ricerche fisiche intorno alla salubrità dell'aria (Physical investigations on the salubrity of air), published in 1775. In it he described a new instrument, the eudiometer, which was later improved by Volta with the addition of spark wires. In 1781 he published his second book, Opuscoli fisico-chimici (Physical-chemical pamphlets), which contributed to opening a new way to the theory of acidity.

Landriani's treatise Dell'utilità dei conduttori elettrici (1784) focused on the practical application of lightning conductors, particularly in the context of building construction and the increasing use of metals. Landriani explored how conductors could protect structures from lightning strikes, drawing on experiments and observations to support his conclusions.

Between 1787 and 1788 Guyton de Morveau and Antoine-Laurent Lavoisier tried to convince Landriani to change over to the new chemistry, but he never was able to decide between phlogiston and oxygen. After 1790 he dealt exclusively with chemical applications of electric phenomena, and the improvement of scientific instruments used to study meteorology and physics. During his career he enjoyed a popularity comparable only to that of Alessandro Volta and Lazzaro Spallanzani, of all Italian scientists of that time.
