= Eudiometer =

Graduated glass tube used to measure the change in volume of a gas mixture

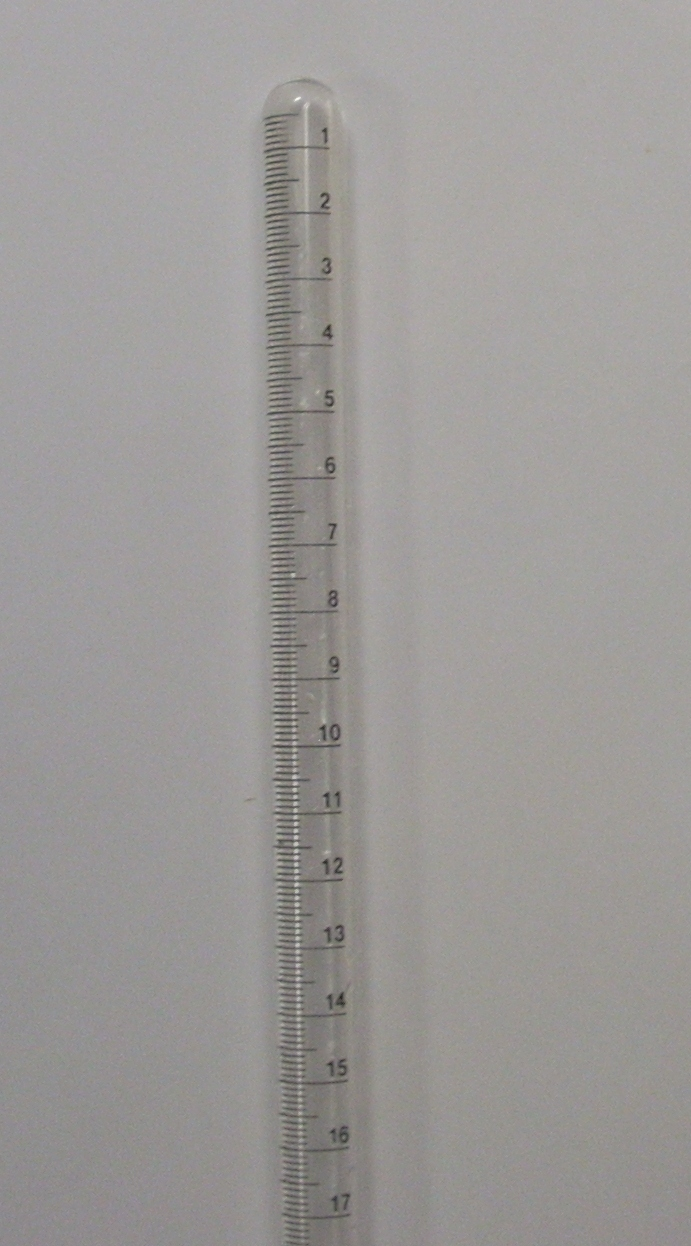
- Closed end of a eudiometer
- Uses: Gas volume measurement
- Notable experiments: Composition of water
- Inventor: Marsilio Landriani
- Related items: Barometer; Burette

A eudiometer is a laboratory device that measures the change in volume of a gas mixture following a physical or chemical change.

== Description ==
Depending on the reaction being measured, the device can take a variety of forms. In general, it is similar to a graduated cylinder, and is most commonly found in two sizes: 50 mL and 100 mL. It is closed at the top end with the bottom end immersed in water or mercury. The liquid traps a sample of gas in the cylinder, and the graduation allows the volume of the gas to be measured.

For some reactions, two platinum wires (chosen for their non-reactivity) are placed in the sealed end so an electric spark can be created between them. The electric spark can initiate a reaction in the gas mixture and the graduation on the cylinder can be read to determine the change in volume resulting from the reaction. The use of the device is quite similar to the original barometer, except that the gas inside displaces some of the liquid that is used.

== History ==
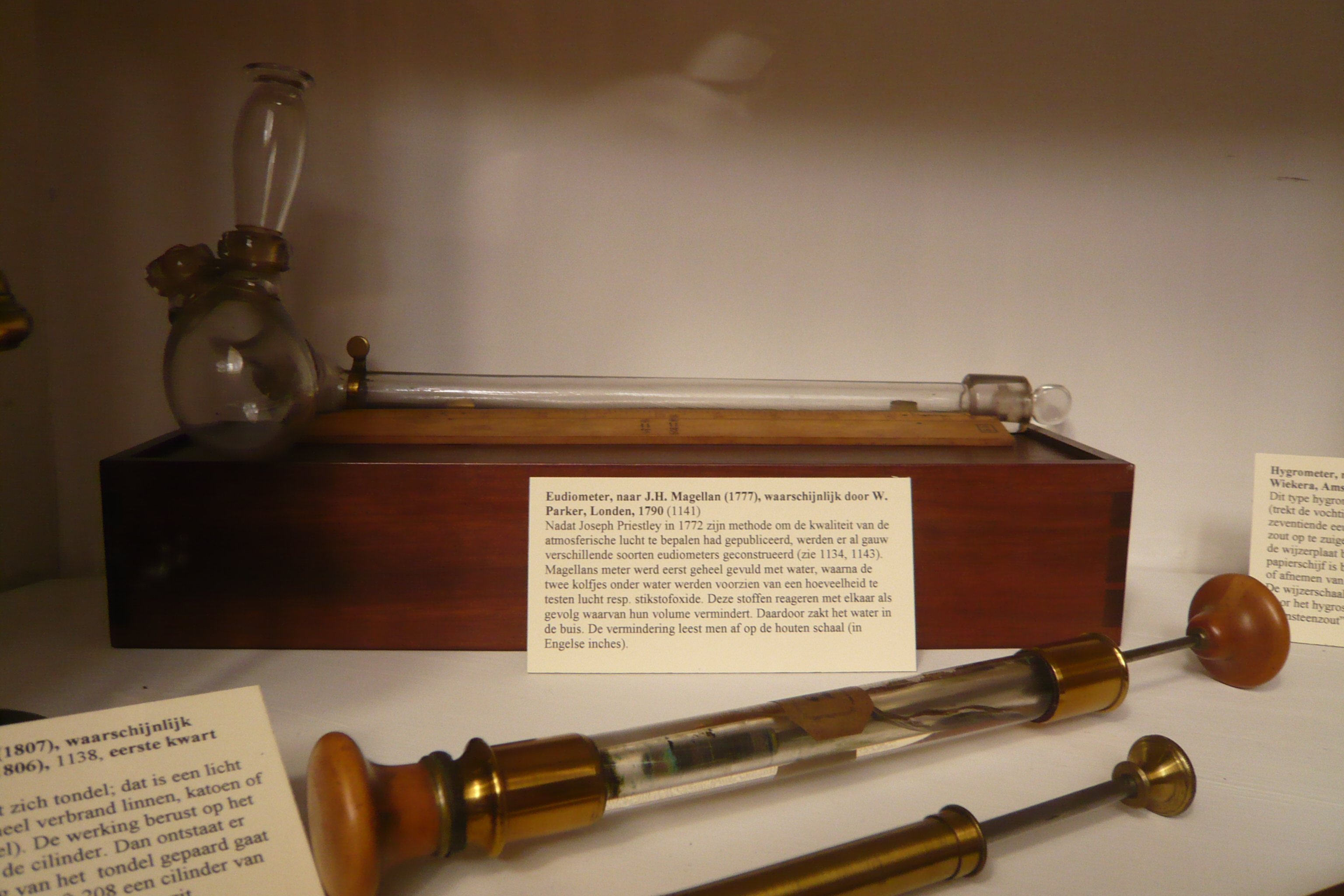
Eudiometer after J.H. de Magellan, Teylers Museum

In 1772, Joseph Priestley began experimenting with different "airs" using his own redesigned pneumatic trough in which mercury instead of water would trap gases that were usually soluble in water. From these experiments Priestley is credited with discovering many new gases such as oxygen, hydrogen chloride, and ammonia. He also discovered a way to find the purity or "goodness" of air using "nitrous air test". The eudiometer functions on the greater solubility of NO_{2} in water over NO, and the oxidation reaction of NO into NO_{2} by air oxygen:

2 NO + O_{2} → 2 NO_{2}.

A quantity of air is combined with NO over water, and the more soluble compound NO_{2} dissolves, leaving the remaining air somewhat contracted in volume. The richer the air was in oxygen, the greater was the contraction.

Marsilio Landriani was studying pneumatic chemistry with Pietro Moscati when they attempted to quantify Priestley's nitric acid test for air quality. Landriani used a pneumatic trough in the form of a tall, graduated cylinder over water. As it measured the salubrity of air, he called it a eudiometer An associate of Moscati's, Felice Fontana also designed a eudiometer on the same principles and quantified the salubrity of the air.

The eudiometer with the nitrous air test was the way Jan Ingenhousz verified that the bubbles given off under water by plant leaves exposed to sunlight were oxygen bubbles. His description of photosynthesis was published in 1779, and in 1785 he wrote about eudiometers in Journal de Physique (v 26, p 339). According to a biographer, Ingenhousz indicated that "many instruments were called eudiometers although strictly speaking they didn't deserve the name ... misunderstandings could exist when not everybody was using the same instruments."

An electrified version of the eudiometer was developed by Count Alessandro Volta (1745–1827), an Italian physicist who is well known for his contributions to the electric battery and electricity. Aside from its laboratory function, the eudiometer is also known for its part in the "Volta pistol". Volta invented this instrument in 1777 for the purpose of testing the "goodness" of air, analyzing the flammability of gases, or to demonstrate the chemical effects of electricity. Volta's Pistol had a long glass tube that was closed at the top, like a eudiometer. Two electrodes were fed through the tube and produced a spark gap inside the tube. Volta's initial use of this instrument concerned the study of swamp gases in particular. Volta's pistol was filled with oxygen and another gas. The homogeneous mixture was taped shut with a cork. A spark could be introduced into the gas chamber by electrodes, and possibly catalyze a reaction by static electricity, using Volta's electrophorus. If the gases were flammable, they would explode, and increase the pressure within the gas chamber. This pressure would be too great and eventually cause the cork to become airborne. Volta's pistol was made with either glass or brass, however due to the electricity the glass was vulnerable to exploding. Volta's extensive studies on measuring and creating high levels of electric currents caused the electrical unit, the volt, to be named after him.

In 1785 Henry Cavendish used a eudiometer to determine the fraction of oxygen in the Earth's atmosphere.

== Etymology ==
The name "eudiometer" comes from the Greek εὔδιος eúdios meaning clear or mild, which is the combination of the prefix eu- meaning "good", and -dios meaning "heavenly" or "of Zeus" (the god of the sky and atmosphere), with the suffix -meter meaning "measure". Because the eudiometer was originally used to measure the amount of oxygen in the air, which was thought to be greater in "nice" weather, the root eudio- appropriately describes the apparatus.

== Usage ==
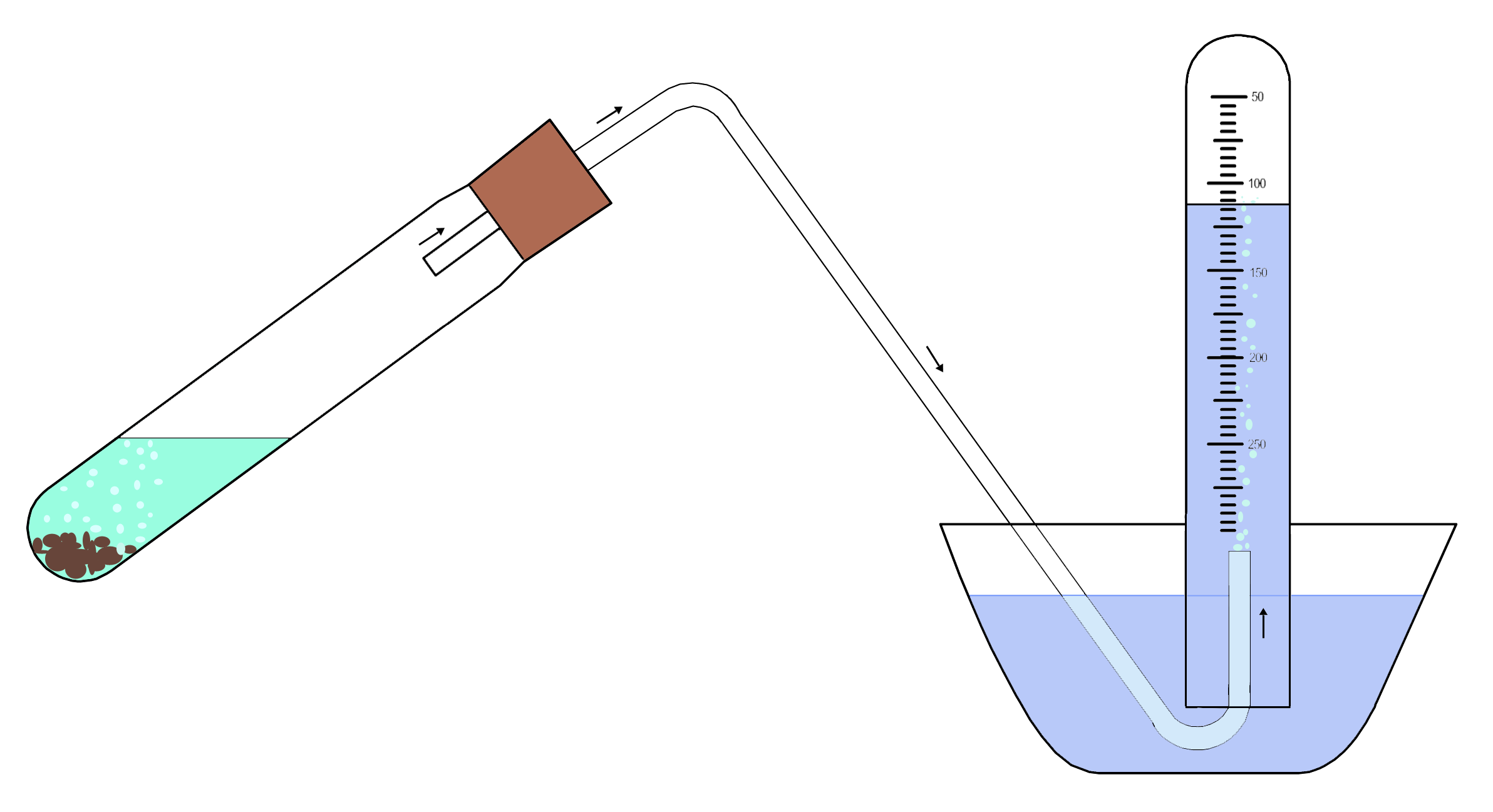
Scheme of eudiometer

Applications of a eudiometer include the analysis of gases and the determination of volume differences in chemical reactions. The eudiometer is filled with water, inverted so that its open end is facing the ground (while holding the open end so that no water escapes), and then submersed in a basin of water. A chemical reaction is taking place through which gas is created. One reactant is typically at the bottom of the eudiometer (which flows downward when the eudiometer is inverted) and the other reactant is suspended on the rim of the eudiometer, typically by means of a platinum or copper wire (due to their low reactivity). When the gas created by the chemical reaction is released, it should rise into the eudiometer so that the experimenter may accurately read the volume of the gas produced at any given time. Normally a person would read the volume when the reaction is completed. This procedure is followed in many experiments, including an experiment in which one experimentally determines the Ideal gas law constant R.

The eudiometer is similar in structure to the meteorological barometer. Similarly, a eudiometer uses water to release gas into the eudiometer tube, converting the gas into a visible, measurable amount. A correct measurement of the pressure when performing these experiments is crucial for the calculations involved in the PV=nRT equation, because the pressure could change the density of the gas.

== See also ==
- Dalton's law
- Distillation
- Ideal gas law
- Laboratory glassware
