= Domenico Chelucci =

Italian mathematician (1681–1754)

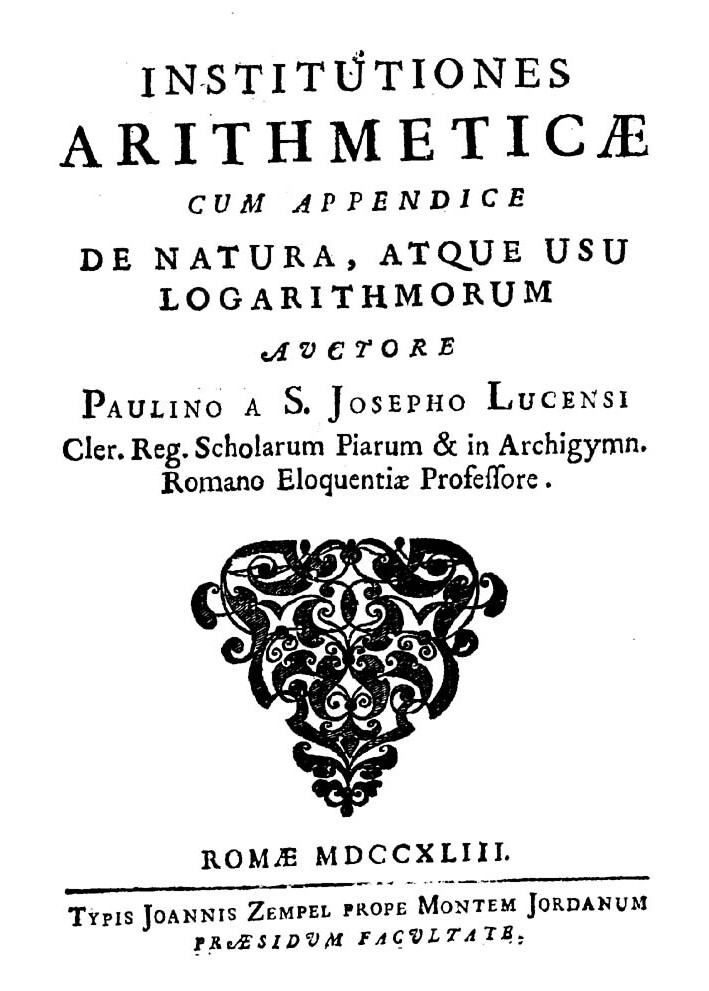
Institutiones arithmeticæ (1743)

Domenico Chelucci (in religion Paolino di S. Giuseppe; Lucca, 25 April 1681 – Rome, 17 January 1754) was an Italian mathematician and priest of the Order of the Piarists, professor and later rector of the Collegio Nazareno ("Nazarene College") in Rome.

== Works ==
- Institutiones arithmeticæ cum appendice de natura, atque usu logarithmorum (in Latin). Roma: Giovanni Zempel. 1743.
- Institutiones analyticæ earumque usus in geometria cum appendice de constructione problematum solidorum (in Latin). Roma: Giovanni Zempel. 1745.
