= Hemoglobin Lepore syndrome =

- Other names: Hb Lepore syndrome
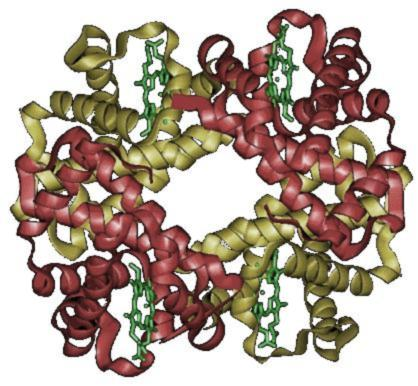
- A crossover between the delta and beta globin gene loci results in the mutation which causes the Hb Lepore trait.

Hemoglobin Lepore syndrome is typically an asymptomatic hemoglobinopathy, which is caused by an autosomal recessive genetic mutation. The Hb Lepore variant, consisting of two normal alpha globin chains (HBA) and two delta-beta globin fusion chains which occurs due to a "crossover" between the delta (HBD) and beta globin (HBB) gene loci during meiosis and was first identified in the Lepore family, an Italian-American family, in 1958. There are three varieties of Hb Lepore, Washington (Hb Lepore Washington, AKA Hb Lepore Boston or Hb Lepore Washington-Boston), Baltimore (Hb Lepore Baltimore) and Hollandia (Hb Hollandia). All three varieties show similar electrophoretic and chromatographic properties and hematological findings bear close resemblance to those of the beta-thalassemia trait; a blood disorder that reduces the production of the iron-containing protein hemoglobin which carries oxygen to cells and which may cause anemia.

The homozygous state for Hb Lepore is rare. Patients of Balkan descent tend to have the most severe presentation of symptoms including severe anemia during the first five years of life. They also presented with significant splenomegaly, hepatomegaly, and skeletal abnormalities identical to those of homozygous beta-thalassemia. The amount of Hb Lepore in the patients blood ranged from 8 to 30%, the remainder being fetal hemoglobin (Hb F) which is present in minute quantities (typically<1 percent) in the red blood cells of adults. Known as F- cells they are present in a small proportion of overall RBCs.

Homozygous Hb Lepore is similar to beta-thalassemia major; however, the clinical course is variable. Patients with this condition typically present with severe anemia during the first two years of life. The heterozygote form is mildly anemic (Hb 11–13 g/dl) but presents with a significant hypochromia (deficiency of hemoglobin in the red blood cells) and microcytosis.

== Presentation ==
=== Complications ===
A potential complication that may occur in children that suffer acute anemia with a hemoglobin count below 5.5 g/dl is silent stroke A silent stroke is a type of stroke that does not have any outward symptoms (asymptomatic), and the patient is typically unaware they have suffered a stroke. Despite not causing identifiable symptoms a silent stroke still causes damage to the brain, and places the patient at increased risk for both transient ischemic attack and major stroke in the future.

== Cause ==
Sickle cell-Hb Lepore Boston syndrome is a type of sickle cell disease (HbS) that differs from homozygous sickle cell disease where both parents carry sickle hemoglobin. In this variant one parent has the sickle cell hemoglobin the second parent has Hb Lepore Boston, the only one of the three variants described in association with HbS.

== Diagnosis ==
The diagnosis of Hb Lepore syndrome may be performed antenatally or postnatally via the use of a variety of tests

- Complete blood count (CBC)
- Cation Exchange High-performance liquid chromatography (CE-HPLC): a chromatographic technique used to separate and quantify various normal and abnormal hemoglobin components in blood.
- Hemoglobin electrophoresis
- DNA analysis

== Treatment ==
=== Homozygous Hb Lepore ===
Those homozygous (Hb LeporeLepore; a very rare situation) or compound heterozygous (Hb Lepore-Β-thalassaemia) might suffer from a severe anaemia. They should be managed in a comprehensive multi-disciplinary program of care. Management includes a regular course of blood transfusions, although the clinical severity in compound (double) heterozygotes can range from minor to major, depending on the combination of genes that have caused the condition.

=== Heterozygous Hb Lepore ===
Individuals heterozygous for the Hb Lepore require no particular treatment. There is no anemia or, if there is, it is very mild.

== Epidemiology ==
The Hb Lepore trait has a worldwide distribution and may affect individuals of various ethnicities however the three main varieties which been defined tend to be more prevalent among specific ethnic groups, typically Caucasians of the Southern regions Central and Eastern Europe. The three main varieties are named for the geographical areas they were first identified in with various subtypes, the three main varieties are:

- Washington (Hb Lepore Washington, also known as Hb Lepore Boston or Hb Lepore Washington-Boston); most common in Italians from Southern Italy
- Baltimore (Hb Lepore Baltimore); first described in a family with African ancestry; most common in people from the Balkan countries, Albanians Croats, Serbs, Slovenes and Romanians. It has also been described in Turks and in regions of Spain and Portugal. A rare case of the Baltimore variety was discovered in an African American woman in the Bronx, New York and dubbed Hn Lepore-Bronx and another variety was discovered in the city of Saskatoon, Saskatchewan, Canada and dubbed Hb E-Lepore Saskatoon
- Hollandia (Hb Lepore Hollandia); identified in Papua New Guinea and Bangladesh.
