= HBB (disambiguation) =

HBB could refer to:

== Science ==
- Hexabromobenzene
- Beta globin (HBB, β-globin or haemoglobin, beta) a globin protein in adult human hemoglobin A.
- Human β-globin locus

== Places ==
- Headbangers Ball
- National Rail station code for Hubberts Bridge railway station, England

== Television ==
- Has Bilgi Birikim - a defunct Turkish television channel.
- Hybrid Broadcast Broadband TV European initiative to combine broadcast television with the internet

== Other ==
- Humongous Bank and Broker - Informal term used to denote very large financial institutions in the United States
- Honey Badger Brigade (or Twitter account HoneyBadgerBite), a website launched November 2013 based on the Honey Badger Radio series launched August 2013 on BlogTalkRadio on the AVoiceforMen channel.
- Home-based business, a type of small business
