= Hereditary persistence of fetal hemoglobin =

- Other names: Hereditary persistence of foetal haemoglobin
- Specialty: Pediatrics

Hereditary persistence of fetal hemoglobin (HPFH) is a benign condition in which increased fetal hemoglobin (hemoglobin F, HbF) production continues well into adulthood, disregarding the normal shutoff point after which only adult-type hemoglobin should be produced.

== Presentation ==
The condition is asymptomatic, and is only noticed when screening for other hemoglobin disorders.

=== Sickle cell disease ===
In persons with sickle cell disease, high levels of fetal hemoglobin as found in a newborn or as found abnormally in persons with hereditary persistence of fetal hemoglobin, the HbF causes the sickle cell disease to be less severe. In essence, the HbF inhibits polymerization of HbS. A similar mechanism occurs with persons who have sickle cell trait. Approximately 40% of the hemoglobin is in the HbS form while the rest is in normal HbA form. The HbA form interferes with HbS polymerization.

== Causes ==
HPFH can be caused by mutations in the β globin gene cluster, or the γ gene promoter region. In addition HbF levels are influenced by polymorphisms in the BCL11A gene and in the MYB gene enhancer. In HPFH the percentage of HbF varies from 0.8-1.0% to about 30% of the total hemoglobin, but levels as high as 100% can be seen in homozygotes for delta-beta thalassemia.

== Diagnosis ==
HPFH is diagnosed based on a significant elevation of HbF.

== Epidemiology ==
About 10% of the population has an HbF level >1.0%. HPFH may alleviate the severity of certain hemoglobinopathies and thalassemias, and is selected for in populations with a high prevalence of these conditions (which in turn are often selected for in areas where malaria is endemic). Thus, it has been found to affect people of African and Greek descent.
