= Control region =

Control region may refer to:

- mtDNA control region, an area of the mitochondrial genome which is non-coding DNA.
- Locus control region, a long-range cis-regulatory element that enhances expression of linked genes at ectopic chromatin sites.
- Internal control region, a sequence of DNA located with the coding region of eukaryotic genes that binds regulatory elements such as activators or repressors.
