= Locus control region =

Long-range cis-regulatory element in DNA

A locus control region (LCR) is a long-range cis-regulatory element that enhances expression of linked genes at distal chromatin sites. It functions in a copy number-dependent manner and is tissue-specific, as seen in the selective expression of β-globin genes in erythroid cells. Expression levels of genes can be modified by the LCR and gene-proximal elements, such as promoters, enhancers, and silencers. The LCR functions by recruiting chromatin-modifying, coactivator, and transcription complexes. Its sequence is conserved in many vertebrates, and conservation of specific sites may suggest importance in function. It has been compared to a super-enhancer as both perform long-range cis regulation via recruitment of the transcription complex.

== History ==
The β-globin LCR was identified over 20 years ago in studies of transgenic mice. These studies determined that the LCR was required for normal regulation of beta-globin gene expression. Evidence of the presence of this additional regulatory element came from a group of patients that lacked a 20 kb region upstream of the β-globin cluster that was vital for expression of any of the β-globin genes. Even though all of the genes themselves and the other regulatory elements were intact, without this domain, none of the genes in the β-globin cluster were expressed.

== Examples ==
Although the name implies that the LCR is limited to a single region, this implication only applies to the β-globin LCR (HBB-LCR). Other studies have found that a single LCR can be distributed in multiple areas around and inside the genes it controls. The β-globin LCR in mice and humans is found 6–22 kb upstream of the first globin gene (epsilon). It controls the following genes:

- HBE1, hemoglobin subunit epsilon (embryonic)
- HBG2, hemoglobin subunit gamma-2 (fetal)
- HBG1, hemoglobin subunit gamma-1 (fetal)
- HBD, hemoglobin subunit delta (adult)
- HBB, hemoglobin subunit beta (adult)

There is an opsin LCR (OPSIN-LCR) controlling the expression of OPN1LW and the first copies of OPN1MW on the human X chromosome, upstream of these genes. A dysfunctional LCR can cause loss of expression of both opsins, leading to blue cone monochromacy. This LCR is also conserved in teleost fishes including zebrafish.

As of 2002, there are 21 LCR areas known in human. As of 2019, 11 human LCRs are recorded in the NCBI database.

== Proposed models of LCR function ==
Although studies have been conducted to attempt to identify a model of how the LCR functions, evidence for the following models is not strongly supported or precluded.

=== Looping model ===
Transcription factors bind to hypersensitive site cores and cause the LCR to form a loop that can interact with the promoter of the gene it regulates.

=== Tracking model ===
Transcription factors bind to the LCR to form a complex. The complex moves along the DNA helix until it can bind to the promoter of the gene it regulates. Once bound, the transcriptional apparatus increases gene expression.

=== Facilitated tracking model ===
This hypothesis combines the looping and tracking models, suggesting that the transcription factors bind to the LCR to form a loop, which then seeks and binds to the promoter of the gene it regulates.

=== Linking model ===
Transcription factors bind to DNA from the LCR to the promoter in an orderly fashion using non-DNA-binding proteins and chromatin modifiers. This changes chromatin conformation to expose the transcriptional domain.

== Diseases related to the LCR ==
Studies in transgenic mice have shown that β-globin transgenes lacking the LCR condense into a heterochromatic state. Deletion of the LCR from the mouse ß-globin locus, however, results in decreased but developmentally appropriate expression, indicating that the LCR is not necessary for locus activity or developmental regulation.
