= Hiranmoy Das =

American biomedical scientist and professor

Hiranmoy Das FRSB
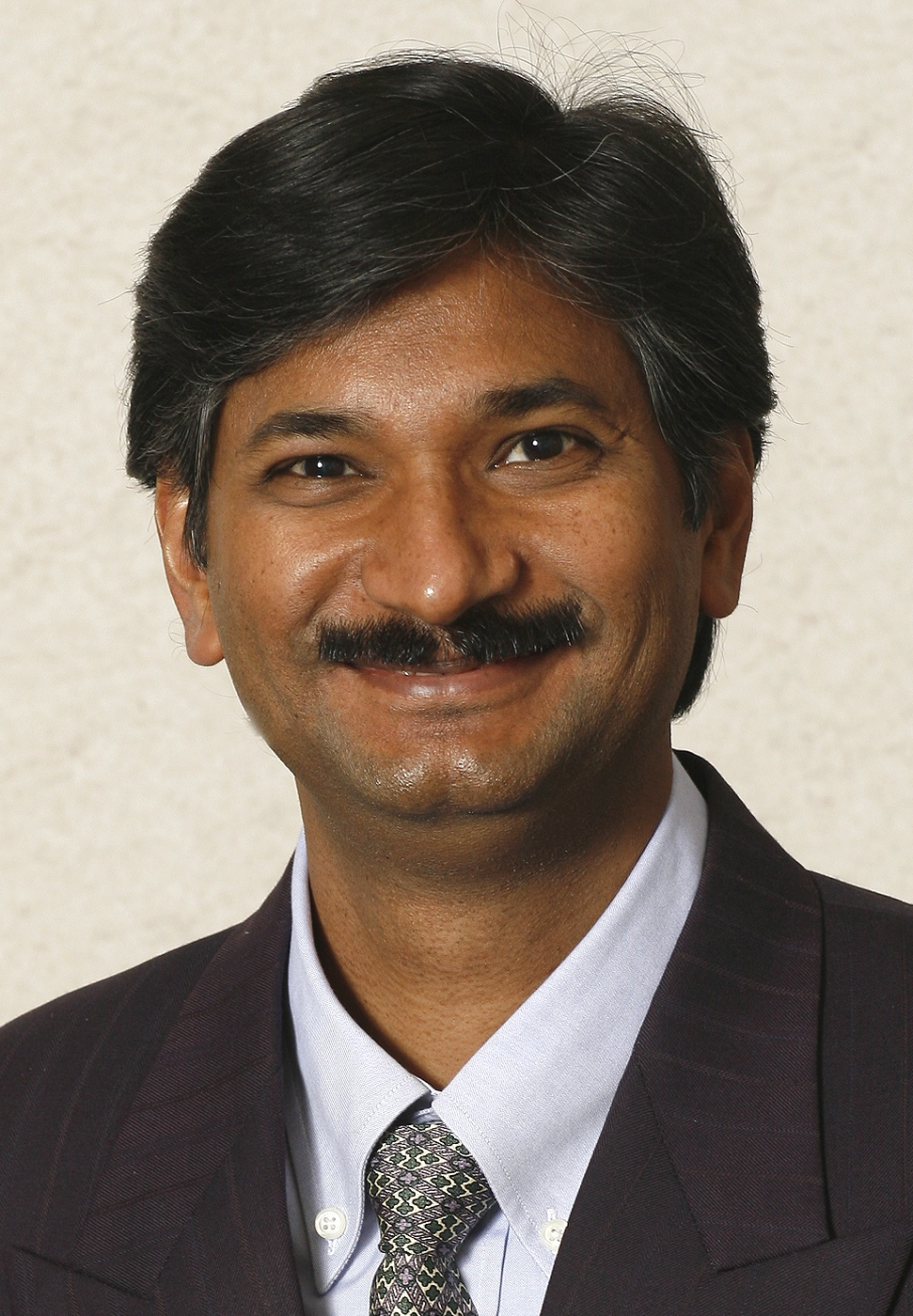
- Born: Tripura, India
- Education: University of Calcutta (BSc, MSc, PhD)
- Known for: Research on KLF2, stem cells, and γδ T cells
- Awards: Fellow of the American Heart Association (2021); Fellow of the National Academy of Inventors (2024); Fellow of the Royal Society of Biology (2026)
- Scientific career
- Fields: Biomedical science, Vascular biology, Stem cell biology, Immunotherapy
- Workplaces: Texas Tech University Health Sciences Center; Ohio State University; Case Western Reserve University; Harvard Medical School

Hiranmoy Das FRSB is an American biomedical scientist and educator. He is currently a Professor in the Department of Pharmaceutical Sciences at the Texas Tech University Health Sciences Center (TTUHSC) Jerry H. Hodge School of Pharmacy, where he directs the Vascular Biology and Stem Cell Research Laboratory. He is a Fellow of the American Heart Association (FAHA), the Royal Society of Biology (FRSB), and the National Academy of Inventors (FNAI).

== Early life and education ==
Das was born in Tripura, India. He studied at the University of Calcutta, where he earned a Bachelor of Science (Honours) in zoology in 1984, a Master of Science in zoology in 1987, and a PhD in biochemistry in 1995.

== Career ==
Das began his career as a scientific officer at the Chittaranjan National Cancer Institute in Kolkata, India, where he worked from 1991 to 1996.

He later joined Harvard Medical School as an instructor in medicine, holding appointments in both the Division of Rheumatology, Immunology and Allergy and the Division of Cardiovascular Medicine at Brigham and Women's Hospital.

In 2006, he was appointed assistant professor of internal medicine at Case Western Reserve University. He subsequently moved to Ohio State University, where he served as associate professor of internal medicine and director of cardiovascular stem cell research laboratories from 2008 to 2016.

Since 2016, Das has been a professor in the Department of Pharmaceutical Sciences at the Jerry H. Hodge School of Pharmacy, Texas Tech University Health Sciences Center.

== Research ==
Das's research is primarily focused on vascular biology, stem cell biology, and regenerative medicine. His work examines the molecular and cellular mechanisms underlying inflammation, tissue repair, and disease progression.

A central area of his research involves the role of transcription factors, particularly Krüppel-like factor 2 (KLF2), in regulating processes such as autophagy, mitophagy, mitochondrial function, and reactive oxygen species signaling. His studies have investigated how these pathways influence cellular homeostasis and contribute to conditions including atherosclerosis, rheumatoid arthritis, and cardiovascular disease.

Das has also conducted research on the therapeutic potential of stem cells, including hematopoietic stem cells and dental pulp stem cells, in tissue repair and regeneration. His work explores applications in bone regeneration, wound healing, neurodegenerative disorders, and inflammatory diseases.

In addition, his research has addressed mechanisms of osteoclast and osteoblast activity in bone remodeling, as well as the role of stem cells in neuroinflammation and cancer-related processes.

Das has led and participated in research projects supported by the National Institutes of Health (NIH), including studies on stem cell–based therapies, corneal diseases, and immune-mediated conditions, often focusing on the regulatory role of KLF2 in disease pathways.

== Honors and awards ==
- 2008–2013 – National Institutes of Health / NIAMS K01 Career Development Award
- 2021 – Fellow of the American Heart Association (FAHA)
- 2021–2022 – Chancellor's Council Distinguished Research Award, Texas Tech University Health Sciences Center
- 2022 – President's Excellence in Research Award, Texas Tech University Health Sciences Center
- 2024 – Fellow of the National Academy of Inventors
- 2026 – Fellow of the Royal Society of Biology

== Books ==
- Das, Hiranmoy (ed.) (2018). Bone Regeneration: Concepts, Clinical Aspects and Future Directions. Nova Science Publishers. ISBN 978-1-53613-990-7
- Das, Hiranmoy (ed.) (2020). Methods in Molecular Biology: Wound Regeneration. Humana Press. ISBN 978-1-07160844-9
- Das, Hiranmoy (ed.) (2025). Tissue Repair and Regeneration: Elucidating Cellular and Molecular Mechanisms with Therapeutic Implications. Springer Nature. ISBN 978-3-031-93676-0

== Selected publications ==
- Das, H.; Groh, V.; Kuijl, C.; Sugita, M.; Morita, C. T.; Spies, T.; Bukowski, J. F. (2001). "MICA engagement by human Vγ2Vδ2 T cells enhances their antigen-dependent effector function". Immunity. 15 (1): 83–93. doi:10.1016/S1074-7613(01)00168-6. PMID 11485740.
- Das, H.; Wang, L.; Kamath, A.; Bukowski, J. F. (2001). "Vγ2Vδ2 T cell receptor-mediated recognition of aminobisphosphonates". Blood. 98 (5): 1616–1618. doi:10.1182/blood.V98.5.1616. PMID 11520816.
- Sen-Banerjee, S.; Mir, S.; Lin, Z.; Hamik, A.; Atkins, G. B.; Das, H.; Banerjee, P.; Kumar, A.; Jain, M. K. (2005). "Krüppel-like factor 2 as a novel mediator of statin effects in endothelial cells". Circulation. 112 (5): 720–726. doi:10.1161/CIRCULATIONAHA.104.525774. PMID 16043642.
- Das, H.; Kumar, A.; Lin, Z.; Patino, W. D.; Hwang, P. M.; Feinberg, M. W.; Majumder, P. K.; Jain, M. K. (2006). "Krüppel-like factor 2 regulates proinflammatory activation of monocytes". Proceedings of the National Academy of Sciences. 103 (17): 6653–6658. doi:10.1073/pnas.0508235103. PMC 1458936. PMID 16617118.
- Fisch, S.; Gray, S.; Heymans, S.; Halder, S.; Wang, B.; Pfister, O.; Cui, L.; Kumar, A.; Lin, Z.; Sen-Banerjee, S.; Das, H.; Petersen, C. A.; Mende, U.; Burleigh, B. A.; Zhu, Y.; Pinto, Y.; Liao, R.; Jain, M. K. (2007). "Krüppel-like factor 15 is a novel regulator of cardiomyocyte hypertrophy". Proceedings of the National Academy of Sciences. 104 (17): 7074–7079. doi:10.1073/pnas.0701981104. PMC 1855421. PMID 17438289.
- Joseph, M.; Das, M.; Kanji, S.; Lu, J.; Aggarwal, R.; Chakroborty, D.; Sarkar, C.; Yu, H.; Mao, H. Q.; Basu, S.; Pompili, V. J.; Das, H. (2014). "Retention of stemness and vasculogenic potential of human umbilical cord blood stem cells after repeated expansions on PES-nanofiber matrices". Biomaterials. 35 (30): 8566–8575. doi:10.1016/j.biomaterials.2014.06.037. PMC 4131920. PMID 25002260.
- Laha, D.; Deb, M.; Das, H. (2019). "KLF2 regulates osteoclastogenesis by modulating autophagy". Autophagy. 15 (12): 2063–2075. doi:10.1080/15548627.2019.1596491. PMC 6844519. PMID 30894058.
- Maity, J.; Deb, M.; Greene, C.; Das, H. (2020). "KLF2 regulates dental pulp-derived stem cell differentiation through the induction of mitophagy and altering mitochondrial metabolism". Redox Biology. 36 101622. doi:10.1016/j.redox.2020.101622. PMC 7417940. PMID 32777717.
- Maity, J.; Barthels, D.; Sarkar, J.; Prateeksha, P.; Deb, M.; Rolph, D.; Das, H. (2022). "Ferutinin induces osteoblast differentiation of DPSCs via induction of KLF2 and autophagy/mitophagy". Cell Death & Disease. 13 (5): 452. doi:10.1038/s41419-022-04903-9. PMC 9098908. PMID 35552354.
- Sarkar, J.; Das, M.; Howlader, M. S. I.; Prateeksha, P.; Barthels, D.; Das, H. (2022). "Epigallocatechin-3-gallate inhibits osteoclastic differentiation by modulating mitophagy and mitochondrial functions". Cell Death & Disease. 13 (10): 908. doi:10.1038/s41419-022-05343-1. PMC 9616829. PMID 36307395.
