= HBDS =

HBDS may stand for :

- heparin-based delivery system
- various other acronyms.

See also :

- HBD, Hemoglobin subunit delta
- honey bee deaths, due to colony collapse disorder
