= HBE1 =

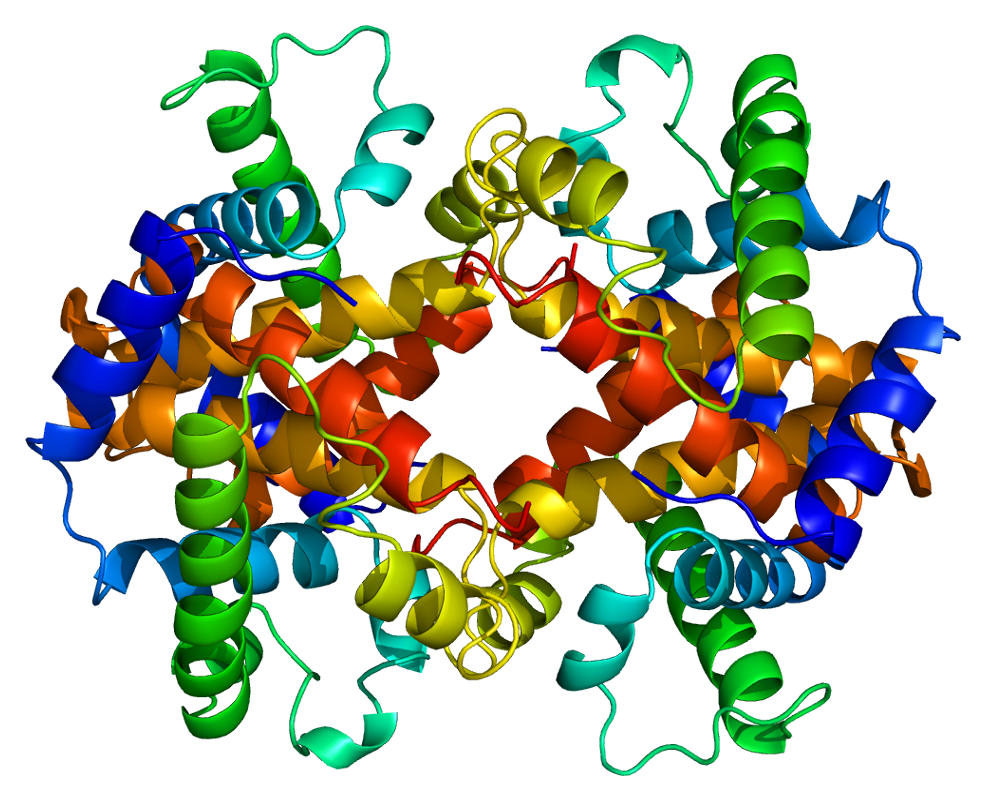
Available structures
| PDB | Ortholog search: PDBe RCSB |
| PDB | List of PDB id codes 1A9W |

Identifiers
- Aliases: HBE1, HBE, hemoglobin subunit epsilon 1
- External IDs: OMIM: 142100; MGI: 96024; HomoloGene: 110794; GeneCards: HBE1; OMA:HBE1 - orthologs

Gene location (Human)
| Chr. | Chromosome 11 (human) |
| Band | 11p15.4 | Start | 5,268,345 bp |
| Band | 11p15.4 | End | 5,505,652 bp |

Gene location (Mouse)
| Chr. | Chromosome 7 (mouse) |
| Band | 7 E3|7 54.85 cM | Start | 103,490,844 bp |
| Band | 7 E3|7 54.85 cM | End | 103,492,371 bp |
RNA expression pattern
| Bgee | Human / Mouse (ortholog); Top expressed in: testicle; gonad; ganglionic eminence; blood; monocyte; stromal cell of endometrium; apex of heart; ventricular zone; gastrocnemius muscle; anterior cingulate cortex / Top expressed in: abdominal wall; yolk sac; somite; endocardial cushion; internal carotid artery; maxillary prominence; external carotid artery; hand; mandibular prominence; tail of embryo; More reference expression data |
| BioGPS | n/a |
Gene ontology
| Molecular function | hemoglobin alpha binding; metal ion binding; heme binding; iron ion binding; oxygen binding; oxygen carrier activity; protein binding; peroxidase activity; haptoglobin binding; organic acid binding |
| Cellular component | cytosol; blood microparticle; hemoglobin complex; haptoglobin-hemoglobin complex |
| Biological process | protein heterooligomerization; blood coagulation; oxygen transport; response to organic cyclic compound; transport; hydrogen peroxide catabolic process; cellular oxidant detoxification |
Sources:Amigo / QuickGO
Orthologs
| Species | Human | Mouse |
| Entrez | 3046 | 15132 |
| Ensembl | ENSG00000213931 | ENSMUSG00000052217 |
| UniProt | P02100 | P04444 |
| RefSeq (mRNA) | NM_005330 | NM_008219 |
| RefSeq (protein) | NP_005321; NP_005321.1 | NP_032245 |
| Location (UCSC) | Chr 11: 5.27 – 5.51 Mb | Chr 7: 103.49 – 103.49 Mb |
| PubMed search |
- Wikidata
| View/Edit Human | View/Edit Mouse |

Hemoglobin subunit epsilon is a protein that in humans is encoded by the HBE1 gene.

== Function ==
The epsilon globin gene (HBE) is normally expressed in the embryonic yolk sac: two epsilon chains together with two zeta chains (an alpha-like globin) constitute the embryonic hemoglobin Hb Gower I; two epsilon chains together with two alpha chains form the embryonic Hb Gower II. Both of these embryonic hemoglobins are normally supplanted by fetal, and later, adult hemoglobin. The five beta-like globin genes are found within a 45 kb cluster on chromosome 11 in the following order: 5' - epsilon – gamma-G – gamma-A – delta – beta - 3'.

== See also ==
- Hemoglobin
- Human β-globin locus
- Hemoglobin alpha chains (two genes, same sequence):
  - HBA1
  - HBA2
