= Fetal hemoglobin =

Oxygen carrier protein in the human fetus

- (4 subunits, α_{2}γ_{2})
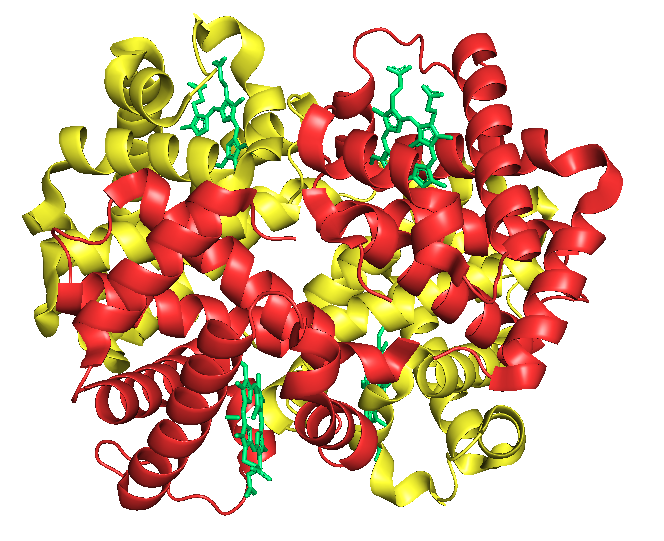
- Structure of fetal hemoglobin (HbF). The 2α and 2γ subunits are in red and yellow, respectively, and the iron-containing heme groups in green. From PDB: 4MQJ, by authors Soman, J. and Olson J.S.
- Protein type: metalloprotein, globulin
- Function: oxygen-transport
- Cofactor(s): heme (4)
Subunit name	Gene	Chromosomal locus
Hb-α1	HBA1	Chr. 16 p13.3
Hb-α2	HBA2	Chr. 16 p13.3
Hb-γ1	HBG1	Chr. 11 p15.4
Hb-γ2	HBG2	Chr. 11 p15.4

Fetal hemoglobin, or foetal haemoglobin (also hemoglobin F, HbF, or α_{2}γ_{2}) is the main oxygen carrier protein in the human fetus. Hemoglobin F is found in fetal red blood cells, and is involved in transporting oxygen from the mother's bloodstream to organs and tissues in the fetus. It is produced at around 6 weeks of pregnancy and the levels remain high after birth until the baby is roughly 2–4 months old. Hemoglobin F has a different composition than adult forms of hemoglobin, allowing it to bind (or attach to) oxygen more strongly; this in turn enables the developing fetus to retrieve oxygen from the mother's bloodstream, which occurs through the placenta found in the mother's uterus.

In the newborn, levels of hemoglobin F gradually decrease and reach adult levels (less than 1% of total hemoglobin) usually within the first year, as adult forms of hemoglobin begin to be produced. Diseases such as beta thalassemias, which affect components of the adult hemoglobin, can delay this process, and cause hemoglobin F levels to be higher than normal. In sickle cell anemia, increasing the production of hemoglobin F has been used as a treatment to relieve some of the symptoms.

== Structure and genetics ==
Hemoglobin F, like adult hemoglobin (hemoglobin A and hemoglobin A2), has four subunits or chains. Each subunit contains a heme group with an iron element which is key in allowing the binding and unbinding of oxygen. As such, hemoglobin F can adopt two states: oxyhemoglobin (bound to oxygen) and deoxyhemoglobin (without oxygen). As hemoglobin F has 4 heme groups, it can bind to up to four oxygen molecules. It is composed of two α (alpha) subunits and two y (gamma) subunits, whereas hemoglobin A (97% of total hemoglobin in adults) is composed of two α and two β (beta) subunits.

In humans, the α subunit is encoded on chromosome 16 and the γ subunit is encoded on chromosome 11. There are two very similar genes that code for the α subunit, HBA1 and HBA2. The protein that they produce is identical, but they differ in gene regulatory regions that determine when or how much of the protein is produced. This leads to HBA1 and HBA2 contributing 40% and 60%, respectively, of the total α subunits produced. As a consequence, mutations on the HBA2 gene are expected to have a stronger effect than mutations on the HBA1 gene. There are also two similar copies of the gene coding for the γ subunit, HBG1 and HBG2, but the protein produced is slightly different, just in one protein unit: HBG1 codes for the protein form with an alanine at position 136, whereas HBG2 codes for a glycine BCL11A and ZBTB7A are major repressor proteins of hemoglobin F production, by binding to the gene coding for the γ subunit at their promoter region. This happens naturally as the newborn baby starts to switch from producing hemoglobin F to producing hemoglobin A. Some genetic diseases can take place due to mutations to genes coding for components of hemoglobin F. Mutations to HBA1 and HBA2 genes can cause alpha-thalassemia and mutations to the promoter regions of HBG1 and HBG2 can cause hemoglobin F to still be produced after the switch to hemoglobin A should have occurred, which is called hereditary persistence of fetal hemoglobin.

== Production ==
Gene expression of hemoglobin before and after birth, also showing the cells types and organs where different subunits are being produced over time (data on Wood W.G., (1976). Br. Med. Bull. 32, 282.) Figure last adapted by user Leonid 2.

During the first 3 months of pregnancy, the main form of hemoglobin in the embryo/fetus is embryonic hemoglobin, which has 3 variants depending on the types of subunits it contains. The production of hemoglobin F starts from week 6, but it's only from 3 months onwards that it becomes the main type found in fetal red blood cells. The switch to produce adult forms of hemoglobin (essentially hemoglobin A) starts at around 40 weeks of gestation, which is close to the expected time of birth. At birth, hemoglobin F accounts for 50-95% of the infant's hemoglobin and at around 6 months after birth, hemoglobin A becomes the predominant type. By the time the baby is one year old, the proportions of different types of hemoglobin are expected to approximate the adult levels, with hemoglobin F reduced to very low levels. The small proportion of red blood cells containing hemoglobin F are called F-cells, which also contain other types of hemoglobin.

In healthy adults, the composition of hemoglobin is hemoglobin A (~97%), hemoglobin A2 (2.2 - 3.5%) and hemoglobin F (<1%).

Certain genetic abnormalities can cause the switch to adult hemoglobin synthesis to fail, resulting in a condition known as hereditary persistence of fetal hemoglobin.

== Binding to oxygen ==
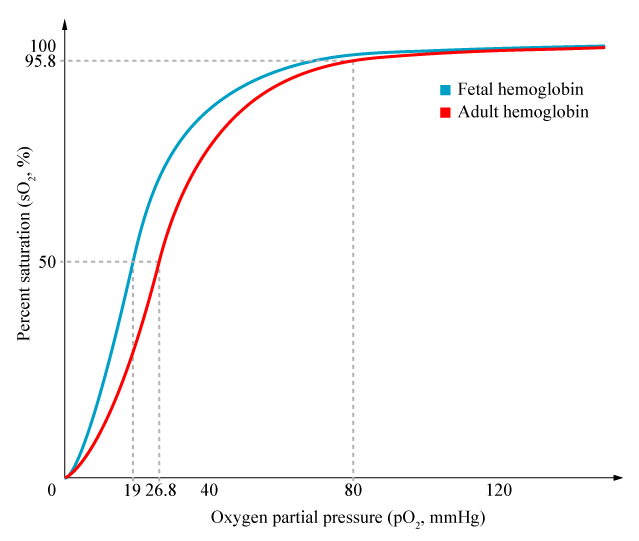
Oxygen-hemoglobin dissociation curves in fetus and adult

=== Factors affecting oxygen affinity ===
The four hemes, which are the oxygen-binding parts of hemoglobin, are similar between hemoglobin F and other types of hemoglobin, including hemoglobin A. Thus, the key feature that allows hemoglobin F to bind more strongly to oxygen is by having γ subunits (instead of β, for example). In fact, some naturally existing molecules in our body can bind to hemoglobin and change its binding affinity for oxygen. One of the molecules is 2,3-bisphosphoglycerate (2,3-BPG) and it enhances hemoglobin's ability to release oxygen. 2,3-BPG interacts much more with hemoglobin A than hemoglobin F. This is because the adult β subunit has more positive charges than the fetal γ subunit, which attract the negative charges from 2,3-BPG. Specifically, the β-subunit of haemoglobin A has a His143 residue that can complex the phosphate; in haemoglobin F this is substituted for a serine residue. Due to the preference of 2,3-BPG for hemoglobin A, hemoglobin F binds to oxygen with more affinity, in average, and there is less of an allosteric inhibition of oxygen binding by 2,3-BPG.

=== Hemoglobin Barts ===
Hemoglobin Barts is an abnormal form of hemoglobin produced in hemoglobin Barts syndrome or alpha-thalassemia major, the most severe form of alpha-thalassemia. Alpha-thalassemia is a genetic blood disorder and one of the most common hemoglobin-related diseases, affecting the production of α subunits from hemoglobin. Depending on how many genes coding for the α subunit are impacted (between one and four), patients with this disease can have reduced to no production of the α subunit of the hemoglobin. As a consequence, less hemoglobin is available and this affects oxygen supply to the tissues. Hemoglobin Barts syndrome manifests when all four genes coding for α subunit are deleted. This is often fatal for the fetus carrying the disorder, as in the absence of α subunits, a form of hemoglobin with four γ subunits, hemoglobin Barts, is produced. This form of hemoglobin isn't fit for oxygen exchange precisely due to its very high affinity for oxygen. While hemoglobin Barts is very efficient at binding oxygen, it doesn't release oxygen to the organs and tissues. The disease is fatal for the fetus or newborn unless early diagnosis and intervention is carried out during pregnancy, and the child will be dependent on lifelong blood transfusions.

=== Quantification of oxygen binding ===
To quantify how strongly a certain type of hemoglobin binds to oxygen (or its affinity for oxygen), a parameter called P50 is often used. In a given situation, P50 can be understood as the partial pressure of oxygen at which Hb is 50% saturated. For example, Hemoglobin F has a lower P50 than hemoglobin A. This means that if we have the same amount of hemoglobin F and hemoglobin A in the blood and add oxygen to it, half of hemoglobin F will bind to oxygen before half of hemoglobin A manages to do so. Therefore, a lower P50 means stronger binding or higher affinity for oxygen.

For reference, the P50 of fetal hemoglobin is roughly 19 mmHg (a measure of pressure), whereas adult hemoglobin is approximately 26.8 mmHg (see Blood gas tension).

== Oxygen exchange in the womb ==
During pregnancy, the mother's circulatory system delivers oxygen and nutrients to the fetus and carries away nutrient-depleted blood enriched with carbon dioxide. The maternal and fetal blood circulations are separate and the exchange of molecules occurs through the placenta, in a region called intervillous space which is located in between maternal and fetal blood vessels.

Focusing on oxygen exchange, there are three important aspects that allow oxygen to pass from the maternal circulation into the fetal circulation. Firstly, the presence of hemoglobin F in the fetus allows a stronger binding to oxygen than maternal hemoglobin (see Factors affecting oxygen affinity). Secondly, the mother's bloodstream is richer in oxygen than that of the fetus, so oxygen naturally flows towards the fetal circulation by diffusion. The final factor is related to the effects of pH on maternal and fetal hemoglobin. As the maternal blood acquires more carbon dioxide, it becomes more acidic and this favors the release of oxygen by the maternal hemoglobin. At the same time, the decrease in carbon dioxide in fetal blood makes it more alkaline and favors the uptake of oxygen. This is called the Bohr effect or Haldane effect, which also happens in the air exchange in the lungs. All of these three factors are present simultaneously and cooperate to improve the fetus' access to oxygen from the mother.

== F-cells ==
F-cells are the subpopulation of red blood cells that contain hemoglobin F, in amongst other types of hemoglobin. While common in fetuses, in normal adults, only around 3-7% of red blood cells contain hemoglobin F. The low percentage of F-cells in adults owes to two factors: very low levels of hemoglobin F being present and its tendency to be produced only in a subset of cells rather than evenly distributed amongst all red blood cells. In fact, there is a positive correlation between the levels of hemoglobin F and number of F-cells, with patients with higher percentages of hemoglobin F also having a higher proportion of F-cells. Despite the correlations between hemoglobin F levels and F-cell numbers, usually they are determined by direct measurements. While the amount of hemoglobin F is calculated using cell lysates, which are fluids with contents of cells that were broken open, F-cell numbers are done by counting intact red blood cells.

Due to the correlation between the amount of hemoglobin F and F-cells, F-cell numbers are higher in some inherited hemoglobin disorders, including beta-thalassemia, sickle cell anemia and hereditary persistence of fetal hemoglobin. Additionally, some acquired conditions can also have higher F-cell numbers, such as acute erythropoietic stress (response to poor oxygenation which includes very rapid synthesis of new red blood cells) and pregnancy. F-cells have similar mass of haemoglobin per cell compared to red blood cells without haemoglobin F, which is measured mean cell haemoglobin values (MCH).

== Conditions with high hemoglobin F ==
=== During pregnancy ===
There is a significant increase in hemoglobin F levels during early pregnancy. However, it's not clear whether these levels are stable or decrease as the pregnancy goes on, as different sources reported different results. The increase in hemoglobin F then induces a 3 to 7 fold increase in the number of F-cells in pregnant women, which was observed between the 23rd to 31st week of gestation. However, as to the reason of the increase in hemoglobin F levels in pregnant women, there doesn't seem to be conclusive evidence. While an early study suggested that maternal red blood cells switch on hemoglobin F production during pregnancy, more recent literature suggested that the increase in haemoglobin F could be, at least in part, due to fetal red blood cells being transferred to the maternal circulation.

Presence of high levels of hemoglobin F in pregnant women can impact the growth of the fetus, as fetal red blood cells struggle to compete for the oxygen from the mother's circulation. This is because instead of competing with hemoglobin A, which has a weaker association to oxygen than hemoglobin F, it becomes a competition between fetal and maternal hemoglobin F which have similar affinities for oxygen. As a result, women with hemoglobin F as >70% of total hemoglobin are much more likely to have fetuses that are small for their gestational age compared women with <70% hemoglobin F (at a rate of 100% compared to 8%, respectively).

=== Hereditary persistence of fetal hemoglobin (HPFH) ===
This is a rare benign genetic disease where production of hemoglobin F persists after twelve months of life and into the adulthood. As a result, hemoglobin F is present in a higher number of adult red blood cells than normal. It doesn't present symptoms and is usually discovered when screening for other blood-related diseases. In this condition, the genes coding for the γ subunit (HBG1 and HBG2) are not suppressed shortly before birth. This can happen when a mutation occurs in the promoter region of HBG1 and HBG2, preventing the binding of BCL11A and ZBTB7A proteins. These proteins would normally bind and suppress the production of γ subunits and as they can't bind due to the mutation, γ subunits continue to be produced. There are two types of patients with HPFH: either with one normal copy of the gene and one disease form or with two disease copies. Whereas normal adults have less than 1% of hemoglobin F, patients with only one disease gene have 5-30%. Patients with two disease copies can have hemoglobin F in up to 100% of red blood cells. As other diseases such as sickle cell disease could also cause a higher level of hemoglobin F to be present, it can sometimes be misdiagnosed.

=== Delta beta-thalassemia ===
Delta beta-thalassemia is a rare genetic blood disorder in which the production of both δ and β subunits are reduced or absent. In these cases, the production of the γ subunit increases to compensate for the loss of δ and β subunits, resulting in a higher amount of hemoglobin F present in the blood. Normally, people have two sets of genes for producing δ and β subunits. People with only one set of working genes don't get any symptoms and in the rarely reported cases where both sets of genes are affected, the patients only experienced mild symptoms.

== Clinical significance ==
=== Treatment of sickle-cell disease ===
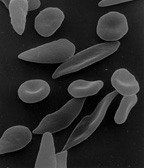
Increasing the body's production of fetal hemoglobin is used as a strategy to treat sickle-cell disease.

The discovery that hemoglobin F alleviated the symptoms of sickle cell disease occurred in 1948. Janet Watson observed that red blood cells from infants with the disease took longer to sickle and did not deform as much compared to their mother's cells, which carried the disease trait. Later, it was noted that patients with sickle cell trait as well as hereditary persistence of hemoglobin F (HPFH) didn't have symptoms. Additionally, in sickle cell patients, F-cells were found to be more long living than non-F cells as they contain hemoglobin F.

When fetal hemoglobin production is switched off after birth, normal children begin producing adult hemoglobin (HbA). Children with sickle-cell disease begin producing a defective form of hemoglobin called hemoglobin S instead, which form chains that cause red blood cells to change their shape from round to sickle-shaped. These defective red blood cells have a much shorter life span than normal red blood cells (10–20 days compared to up to 120 days). They also have a greater tendency to clump together and block small blood vessels, preventing blood supply to tissues and organs. This leads to the so-called vaso-occlusive crisis, which is a hallmark of the disease. If fetal hemoglobin remains relatively high after birth, the number of painful episodes decreases in patients with sickle-cell disease and they have a better prognosis. Fetal hemoglobin's role in reducing disease severity comes from its ability to disrupt the formation of hemoglobin S chains within red blood cells. Interestingly, while higher levels of hemoglobin F were associated with improvement of some symptoms, including the frequency of painful episodes, leg ulcers and the general severity of the disease, it had no correlation to others. A few examples are priapism, stroke and systemic blood pressure. As hemoglobin F are only produced by some red blood cells, in different quantities, only a subpopulation of cells are protected against sickling. It could be that the symptoms that high hemoglobin F doesn't prevent are quite sensitive to the rupture of the sickled non-F cells.

Hydroxyurea is a chemical that promotes the production of fetal hemoglobin and reduces the premature rupturing of red blood cells. Combination therapy with hydroxyurea and recombinant erythropoietin — rather than treatment with hydroxyurea alone — has been shown to further elevate hemoglobin F levels and to promote the development of HbF-containing F-cells.

=== Hemoglobin F as a marker for cancers ===
There have been some studies evaluating the possibility of using hemoglobin F as an indicator of the prognosis for cancer. It has been suggested that elevated concentrations of haemoglobin F can be found in main kinds of solid tumours and blood cancers. Examples include acute lymphoblastic leukemia and myeloid leukemia in children, where higher concentrations of hemoglobin F were associated with a worse outcome, including a higher risk of relapse or death. Other cancer types where higher hemoglobin F levels have been observed are transitional cell cancer, colorectal carcinoma and various types of blastomas. In fact, in several types of blastomas, including neuroblastoma and retinoblastoma (affecting the nerve cells and the eyes, respectively), F-cells were found in newly formed blood vessels and spaces in between tumour cells. Clusters of F-cells were also present in the bone marrow of some of these patients. Interestingly, hemoglobin F is not directly produced by tumour cells, but seems to be induced by the biological environment of the cancer in nearby blood cells. A reason suggested for this increase in hemoglobin F is that it may favor cancer growth by providing better oxygen supply to the developing cancerous cells. In adults, increased hemoglobin F production is thought to be caused by factors leading to the activation of the gene coding for the γ subunit, such as DNA demethylation (which can activate normally silent genes and is a hallmark of cancer).
