= Embryonic hemoglobin =

Chemical compound

Embryonic hemoglobin is a tetramer produced in the blood islands in the embryonic yolk sac during the mesoblastic stage (from 3rd week of pregnancy until 3 months). The protein is commonly referred to as hemoglobin ε. Hemoglobin is made up of four globin chains along with a heme group that contains an iron atom responsible for binding oxygen, with each molecule including two α-type globin and two β-type globin. The genes that produce the alpha chains are located together in a cluster on chromosome 16 and the genes for beta chains form from a separate cluster on chromosome 11.

In humans, the earliest blood islands containing primitive erythroid cells appear in the yolk sac at roughly 17 days of development. These first erythrocytes are large, nucleated cells that produce globin chains and begin circulating in the embryo around day 22, coinciding with the onset of cardiac activity.

Although adult hemoglobin is well known to science, embryonic hemoglobin is considered little-known due to its difficult nature being acquired and given ethical contradictions. In recent years, transgenic mice have been able to overcome those difficulties and allow research of embryonic hemoglobins in their native states. Comparing embryonic globin and hemoglobins in humans and mice allow scientists to study their evolutional purposes by looking at when each form is expressed, which globin subunits they contain, and which erythroid or non-erythroid cell types they are associated with.

== Functions ==
The physiologic properties of embryonic hemoglobin include high oxygen affinity. Embryonic hemoglobins are proteins that are able to effectively bind oxygen in environments, embryonic tissue and placental barrier, where there are little amounts of oxygen. The function of embryonic hemoglobin is carried out in large part to the Bohr Effect, an effective exchange between carbon dioxide and oxygen. The protein is capable of oxygen-binding avidity regardless of acidosis. Since both fetal and embryonic hemoglobins are exposed to lower amounts of oxygen, they bind more readily than adult Hb.

== Structure ==
The human embryonic hemoglobins were discovered in 1961. These include Hb-Gower 1, consisting of 2 zeta chains and 2 epsilon chains, and Hb-Gower 2, which consists of 2 alpha-chains and 2 epsilon-chains, the zeta and epsilon chains being the embryonic hemoglobin chains. Not found in embryonic hemoglobins are adult type β chains. Similar to other mammalian hemoglobins, human embryonic hemoglobins are composed of four globin subunits. These subunits each average about 17,000 Daltons and consist of two α-like and two β-like.

=== Hemoglobin Gower 1 ===
Hemoglobin Gower 1 (also referred to as ζ_{2}ε_{2} or Hb Gower-1) is a form of hemoglobin existing only during embryonic life and is the primary embryonic hemoglobin. It is composed of two zeta chains and two epsilon chains, and is relatively unstable, breaking down easily. Due to its pronounced instability, Hb Gower-1 fits the short lifespan of primitive erythrocytes.

=== Hemoglobin Gower 2 ===
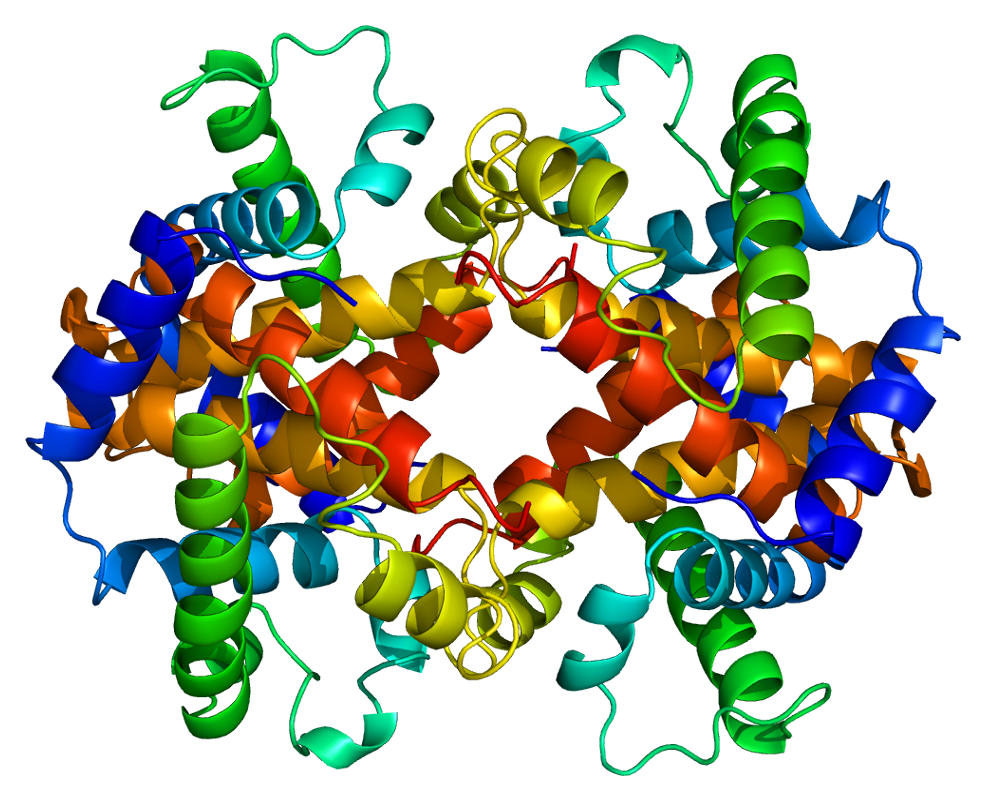
Figure 1. Structure of Hb Gower-2

Hemoglobin Gower 2 (also referred to as α_{2}ε_{2} or Hb Gower-2) is a form of hemoglobin existing at low levels during embryonic and fetal life. It is composed of two alpha chains and two epsilon chains (Figure 1) and is somewhat unstable, though not as much as hemoglobin Gower 1. Since there is a greater stability of Hb Gower-2, it may support its presence in longer-lived definitive erythroid lineage. Due to its relative stability compared to hemoglobin Gower 1 and hemoglobin S, it has been proposed as a subject for reactivation in the adult in cases of severe β thalassemia and hemoglobinopathies in subjects for which the reactivation of hemoglobin F is contraindicated due to toxicity concerns. Thalassemia, characterized by anemia, is an inherited disorder affecting hemoglobin production that may lead to preeclampsia and other hypertensive conditions during pregnancy. β thalassemia results from diminished or absent or absent β-globin synthesis, leading to chronic anemia. Patients who maintain higher levels of γ-globin expression typically experience a less severe form of the disease. Therefore, it is common for anemia to develop during pregnancy due to hemodilution from thalassemia, where blood volume expands but red blood cell mass rise cannot keep up. When oxygen levels fall beyond what is normally seen with mild anemia, hypoxia may be a result and affect placental development.

=== Hemoglobin Portland I ===
Hemoglobin Portland I (also referred to as ζ_{2}γ_{2} or Hb Portland-1) is a form of hemoglobin existing at low levels during embryonic and fetal life, composed of two zeta chains and two gamma chains.

=== Hemoglobin Portland II ===
Hemoglobin Portland II (also referred to as ζ_{2}β_{2} or Hb Portland-2) is a form of hemoglobin existing at low levels during embryonic and fetal life, composed of two zeta chains and two beta chains. It is very unstable, even more so than hemoglobin Gower 1, and breaks down very rapidly under stress. Despite this, it has been proposed as a candidate for reactivation in cases of severe α thalassemia or hemoglobinopathies afflicting the alpha chain.

=== Hemoglobin Portland III ===
Hemoglobin Portland III (also referred to as ζ_{2}δ_{2} or Hb Portland-3) is a form of hemoglobin which has only been detected in stillborn infants with α thalassemia major, in which the alpha chain is completely absent. It is composed of two zeta chains and two delta chains. Hemoglobin Portland III is quite unstable, though less so than hemoglobin Portland II.

== Developmental Expression ==
Figure 2. This graph shows gene expression of hemoglobin prenatal to postnatal with body production sites and cell types in adapting to oxygen levels. The blue line follows alfa-similar globin chains, and the red line follows beta-similar globin chains.

In humans, the body creates and utilizes three different versions of hemoglobin. These versions can be studied through ontogeny which refers to the developmental pattern in which different hemoglobin forms are produced at successive stages of life, with distinct variants predominating during embryonic, fetal, and adult periods. In Figure 2 the graph illustrates these shifts prenatal to postnatal. The x-axis represents the prenatal and postnatal timeline, and the y-axis represents the percent globin synthesis. The top section of the graph shows which organs are responsible for creating red blood cells at different stages.

=== Embryonic Stage ===
The first variant begins in the embryonic stage during gestation, in the baby's yolk sac (Figure 2) which creates ε-globin. The onset of yolk sac erythropoiesis occurs as mesenchymal cells transition into hematopoietic stem cells capable of producing blood cells. The three embryonic human hemoglobins present during the first few months after conception are Portland-1, Gower-1, and Gower-2. This is embryonic hemoglobin and focuses on effectively binding to oxygen in a low oxygen environment. Embryotic chains seen in the early embryos are mostly composed of one α-like and the other β-like.

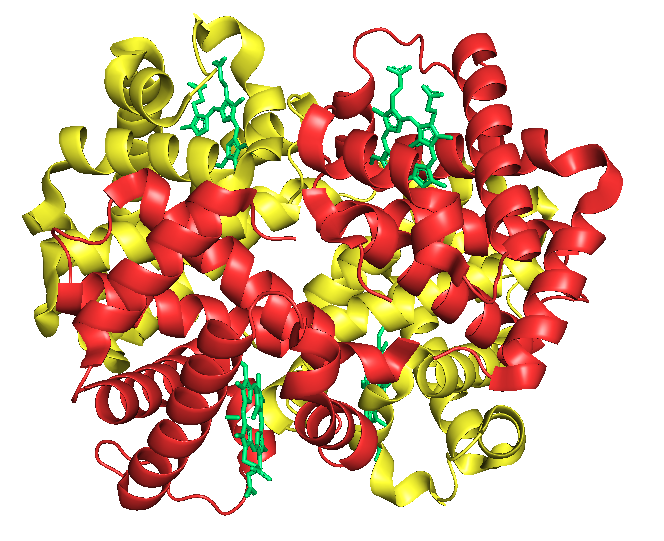
Figure 3. The image shows the structure of fetal hemoglobin. The 2α subunits are shown in red and 2γ subunits in yellow. The 4 heme groups, key in binding oxygen, are shown in green.

=== Fetal Stage ===
Fetal hemoglobin is the next variant shift after embryonic and has been detected in as young as 37-day-old embryos. The yolk sac erythroid cell population of γ genes and α genes are expressed together (both definitive erythropoiesis). The body focuses on the fetal liver and spleen (Figure 2) and starts making γ-globin which is more efficient at binding oxygen from the carrier's blood during this stage. Within the β-globin gene cluster, two duplicated γ-globin form the necessary molecules. Then, the γ-globin chains and adult α-globin chains combine to form stable tetramers (HbF). Figure 3 shows the structure of fetal hemoglobin. The 2 α-like subunits are shown in red and 2 γ-like subunits in yellow. The 4 heme groups, key in binding oxygen, are shown in green. Fetal hemoglobin is predominant until birth, where after, an expression switch is made from HbF to HbA.

=== Adult Stage ===
Adult hemoglobin (HbA) is the most common hemoglobin between the three variants. The shift from HbF to HbA shift can be seen in Figure 2 in the postnatal stage where bone marrow becomes the sole site for blood cell production after a few weeks after birth. Around the time of birth, the production of γ chains drops sharply, while the production of β chains rises. At a pH of 7.25 and below, oxygen affinity of fetal and adult hemoglobin decrease, stimulated by tissue acidosis. These developmental expressions have been seen as the subunit interfaces of the hemoglobins strengthen progressively during development using low concentration gel-filtered conditions, showing evidence of shifting tetramer, dimer, and monomer proportions. This maturation reflects competition among globin chains for partners that form more stable interactions. Therefore, intrinsic biochemical properties of globin proteins themselves can influence the course of developmental transitions.

Visualization of Hb Shifts

Figure 4. This chart shows how the Bohr Effect plays a role in Hb saturation.

In Figure 4 the chart shows how the Bohr Effect plays a role in Hb saturation. The horizontal axis describes that partial pressure of oxygen in Hg in mm, which reflects the amount of oxygen available. The vertical axis shows oxygen saturation and what percentage of Hg is carrying oxygen. The red line represents a higher affinity for oxygen, which is triggered in environments with higher pH, lower temperature, and lower carbon dioxide levels. This is where embryonic hemoglobin is in effect. The green line represents the shift from embryonic Hb to fetal Hb due to the Bohr Effect. The blue line represents a further shift triggered by acidosis (lowered pH) with increased temperature and carbon dioxide levels. This is where the shift from fetal hemoglobin to adult hemoglobin occurs.

== Genetics ==
Both experimental and clinical observations have shown that embryonic hemoglobin genes can become active outside their normal developmental period. This causes the appearance of erythroid cells of newborns and adults. These disruptions in globin gene regulation often occur in conditions involving chromosomal abnormalities and suggest that structural changes in genomic DNA can lead to atypical patterns of globin expression. The mechanisms that shut down expression of specific hemoglobin, reflected in the disappearance of certain hemoglobin types, are not well defined. Differences in the stability of embryonic, fetal, and adult globin mRNAs are thought to contribute to developmental silencing.

For example, chromosomal abnormalities can lead to a delay in switching from embryonic hemoglobin. The coordinated switching of globin genes, driven by scientific promoter activity and repressor mechanisms, is generally used to explain how the first three hemoglobin types are normally turned on and off during development. The genes that encode α-like and β-like globin are organized into two distinct clusters located on different chromosomes. Within each cluster, the genes are arranged linearly from an embryonic globin gene at the 5' end to an adult globin at the 3' end, mirroring the sequence in which they are activated during development. All hemoglobin molecules can undergo post-transitional changes that give rise to minor hemoglobin variants.

Naturally occurring mutations that elevate γ-globin production are found within promoters of the γ-globin genes, and these altered sites overlap with binding motifs for the transcription factors BCL11A and ZBTB7A. This has produced difficulties in efforts to bind a therapeutic strategy for reactivating fetal γ-globin in individuals with β thalassemia. Recent work has shown that the LIN28B pathway influences BCL11A translation in humans, and additional regulators such as ATF4 and MYB have been reported to enhance BCL11A expression. Modulating these factors may then support the re-expression of γ-globin.

In embryonic erythroid cells, regulation of globin gene expression alters the relative synthesis rates of different globin chains as cells progress through terminal differentiation. During embryonic and fetal development, additional regulatory mechanisms shift production away from embryonic globin and toward fetal and adult forms. Although these developmental transitions are well documented, the specific signals that drive them in mammals are still largely unknown, and only a limited number of molecular pathways have been identified that many contribute to the control of embryonic globin gene expression.

== Table ==
	ζ chain	α chain
ε chain	Hb Gower 1	Hb Gower 2
γ chain	Hb Portland I	HbF
β chain	Hb Portland II	HbA
δ chain	Hb Portland III	HbA_{2}

The table illustrates the different types of hemoglobin formed by the combinations of various globin chains. Note that hemoglobin is always a tetramer consisting of two pairs of these chains.
