= HBD (gene) =

Mammalian protein found in Homo sapiens

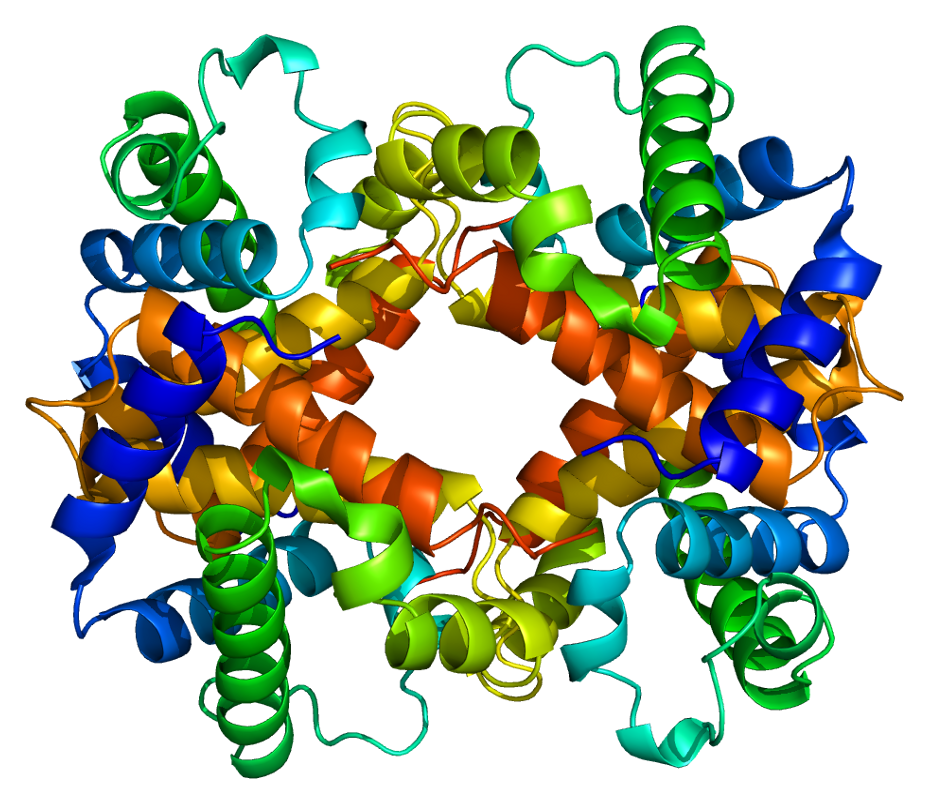
Available structures
PDB	Human UniProt search: PDBe RCSB
PDB	List of PDB id codes 1SHR, 1SI4

Identifiers
- Aliases: HBD, hemoglobin subunit delta
- External IDs: OMIM: 142000; HomoloGene: 128037; GeneCards: HBD; OMA:HBD - orthologs

Gene location (Human)
Chr.	Chromosome 11 (human)
Band	11p15.4	Start	5,232,678 bp
Band	11p15.4	End	5,243,657 bp
RNA expression pattern
Bgee	Human / Mouse (ortholog); Top expressed in: trabecular bone; bone marrow; bone marrow cells; monocyte; blood; vena cava; endothelial cell; periodontal fiber; spleen; decidua / n/a; More reference expression data
BioGPS	n/a
Gene ontology
Molecular function	iron ion binding; oxygen binding; protein binding; heme binding; metal ion binding; oxygen carrier activity; peroxidase activity; haptoglobin binding; hemoglobin alpha binding; organic acid binding
Cellular component	hemoglobin complex; cytosol; blood microparticle; haptoglobin-hemoglobin complex
Biological process	oxygen transport; blood coagulation; transport; hydrogen peroxide catabolic process; protein heterooligomerization; cellular oxidant detoxification
Sources:Amigo / QuickGO
Orthologs
Species	Human	Mouse
Entrez	3045	n/a
Ensembl	ENSG00000223609	n/a
UniProt	P02042	n/a
RefSeq (mRNA)	NM_000519	n/a
RefSeq (protein)	NP_000510	n/a
Location (UCSC)	Chr 11: 5.23 – 5.24 Mb	n/a
PubMed search		n/a
- Wikidata
View/Edit Human

Hemoglobin subunit delta is a protein that in humans is encoded by the HBD gene.

== Function ==
The delta (HBD) and beta (HBB) genes are normally expressed in the adult: two alpha chains plus two beta chains constitute HbA, which in normal adult life comprises about 97% of the total hemoglobin. Two alpha chains plus two delta chains constitute HbA2, which with HbF comprises the remaining 3% of adult hemoglobin. Five beta-like globin genes are found within a 45 kb cluster on chromosome 11 in the following order: 5' - epsilon – gamma-G – gamma-A – delta – beta - 3'.

== Clinical significance ==
Mutations in the delta-globin gene are associated with Delta-thalassemia.

== See also ==
- Hemoglobin
- Human β-globin locus
- Thalassemia
