= Internal control region =

This stylistic diagram shows a gene in relation to the double helix structure of DNA and to a chromosome (right). The chromosome is X-shaped because it is dividing. Introns are regions often found in eukaryote genes that are removed in the splicing process (after the DNA is transcribed into RNA): Only the exons encode the protein. The diagram labels a region of only 55 or so bases as a gene. In reality, most genes are hundreds of times larger.

An internal control region is a sequence of DNA located with the coding region of eukaryotic genes that binds regulatory elements such as activators or repressors. This region can recruit RNA Polymerase or contribute to splicing.

== See also ==
- DNA
- Gene expression
- Gene family
