= Human β-globin locus =

The human β-globin locus is a cluster of genes located on chromosome 11. It is responsible for creating the β-chains found in hemoglobin. This cluster consists of 5 genes: ϵ, Gγ, Aγ, δ, and β genes, that respective order downstream. These genes are controlled by a locus control region (LCR) and are differentially expressed throughout development. Expression of these genes is regulated in embryonic erythropoiesis by many transcription factors, including KLF1, which is associated with the upregulation of adult hemoglobin in adult definitive erythrocytes, and KLF2, which is vital to the expression of embryonic hemoglobin.

== Mechanism ==
The human beta globin (HBB) locus is located on the short arm of chromosome 11 in an AT-rich region and is part of the olfactory receptor (OR) gene superfamily. The locus is crucial to the production of the β-globin chain of hemoglobin A (HbA), which, alongside the α-globin chain derived from the human alpha globin (HBA) locus, constitutes healthy adult hemoglobin. The locus, spanning across approximately 70 kilobases, includes five individual beta globin-like genes: ϵ, Gγ, Aγ, δ, and β, arranged in that order. The HBB locus is controlled by a 34kb long locus control region (LCR) upstream of the ϵ-gene. The position of each gene from the LCR dictates its temporal regulation, with the genes closer to the LCR being expressed earlier in development, and those further being expressed later in development. Overall, the output of the HBB locus is regulated, regardless of how the individual genes are differentially expressed, to equal the output of its counterpart HBA locus. This ensures that the synthesis of beta globin locus products is in line with the other components that form hemoglobin, the final functional product.

== Regulation ==
=== Fetal to adult switching ===
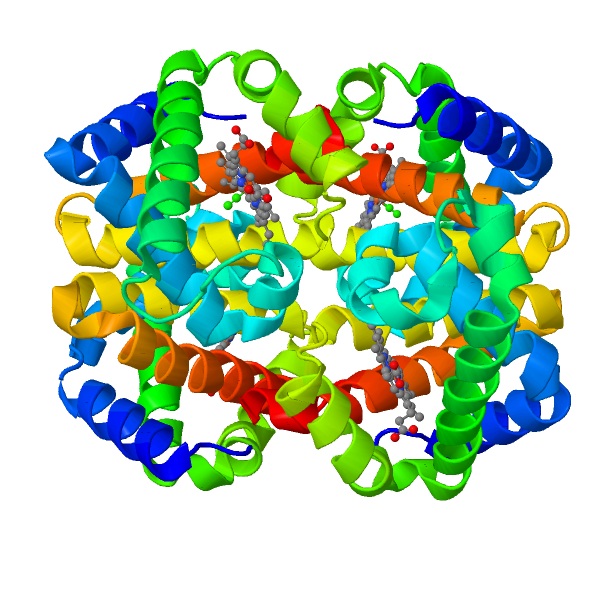
Fetal hemoglobin (HbF), formed by two alpha subunits (top) and two gamma subunits (bottom). The 4 heme groups are also displayed. All chains (ribbons) are rainbow-colored from blue to red (N- to C-termini)

In the early first trimester, an embryonic form of β-globin, ϵ-globin, is produced from the expression of the ϵ-gene. As the fetus develops, tetrameric fetal hemoglobin (HbF) is formed from the fusion of the two γ-globin chains encoded by the γ-genes found in the β-globin locus with adult α-globin chains. This occurs as soon as the first definitive erythrocytes are being produced by the fetal liver from stem and progenitor cells. In healthy humans, the production of HbF drops off at around 9 months of gestational age contrasted by a simultaneous increase of adult hemoglobin (HbA). This switching of hemoglobin production from γ-globin to β-globin in healthy humans is a result of a shift from Gγ and Aγ gene expression to β- and δ-gene expression.

Note that this process is neither complete nor irreversible as adults are able to produce γ-globin at quantities lower than 1% of their total hemoglobin.

=== Expression ===
The regulatory genes required for basal transcription and developmental regulation are found within the first 500 base pairs from the 5'-end of the β-globin locus. Three regulatory elements within the promoter region of the gene cluster have been found to exhibit significantly reduced transcription levels following induced mutation indicating their role in gene regulation. These elements consist of a CACCC box, a CCAAT box, and a TATA box located between base pairs -95 to -30 relative to the start site of transcription. The promoter region of the adult β-globin gene has a regulatory element difference compared with the fetal γ-globin promoter region, consisting of a duplicate of the CACCC box, a single CAAT box, and a single TATA box.

Higher levels of β-locus gene expression necessarily involves the β LCR gene located 6-22 kilobase pairs from the 5'-end. The LCR gene consists of five DNase I hypersensitive sites (HS1-HS5). Each site is capable of being bound by different proteins with varying outcomes. Transcription factors include the proteins NF-E2, GATA-1, and EKLF which bind to sites HS1 to HS4. Specific HS binding patterns also vary widely between species. For example, NF-E2 and GATA-1 are highly abundant at HS2 and HS1/HS4 binding sites, respectively, during the expression of adult β gene and fetal mouse with transgenic γ-globin genes. Nonetheless, there is still much discrepancy surrounding the role and extent to which each HS site of the LCR gene plays due to conflicting results across various studies.

== Structure ==
Structure of fully formed hemoglobin tetramer. Composed of 2 types of globin chains (α- and β-globins; in different colors) produced by HBB and HBA loci respectively, alongside heme groups.

Each gene within the beta globin locus produces its own protein product, a globin chain, when transcribed. For essentially all types of hemoglobin (Hb) at all stages of development, half of the globin chains come from the alpha globin locus (HBA), and half will come from the beta globin locus (HBB). Thus, two globin chains from the HBB locus will form a tetramer alongside its counterpart globin changes from the HBA locus, ferrous iron (Fe2+) in heme groups, and other groups to produce a functioning hemoglobin molecule. The ferrous iron is able to combine with a single oxygen molecule, becoming oxidized to ferric iron (Fe3+). Since there are 4 such ferrous iron ions in hemoglobin, a single molecule is able to bind 4 oxygen molecules. Furthermore, cooperativity, the mechanism under which hemoglobin undergoes structural changes to better bind subsequent oxygen molecules, enables progressively easier binding. This is a reversible process, allowing hemoglobin to bind oxygen in the lungs, and reversing the binding, releasing the oxygen when it reaches its target destination. Cooperativity also works inversely.

Globin chains range from 141-146 amino acids in length, with different chains, each being designated by a greek letter, being the result of varying amino acid sequences. Each globin change is subsequently divided by eight helices, separated by seven non helical segments. The 8 helices, which are rigid and linear, receive an alphabetical designation from A to H. On the other hand, the non helical, connecting segments are designated by the helices they connect. For example, the segment connecting helices A and B would be designated as AB.

== Function ==
Throughout different developmental stages, different globin chains are used to produce different types of hemoglobin suitable for what that developmental stage aims to accomplish. Thus, genes are subject to temporal regulation in both the HBB or HBA locus to ensure that during the proper globin chains are synthesized in their respective developmental stages. Generally, the 3 developmental stages are considered as embryonic, fetal, and adult. The embryonic stage features 4 types of hemoglobin: HbE Portland 1, composed of two ζ-globin and two γ-globin chains, HbE Portland 2, composed of two ζ-globin and two β-globin chains, HbE Gower-1, composed of two ζ-globin and two ε-globin chains, and HbE Gower-2, composed of two α-globin and two ε-globin chains. The fetal stage features 2 types: HBF, composed of two α-globin and two γ-globin chains, and HBA, composed of two α-globin and two β-globin chains. In the adult stage, there are 3 types of hemoglobin: both types of hemoglobin from the fetal stage and HBA2, composed of two α-globin and two δ-globin chains. While these may be all the possible types of hemoglobins that may be found at a certain development stage, the actual distribution of these types can be quite extreme. For instance, nearly all hemoglobin in adults is of the HbA variant, with only small amounts of detectable HbA2 and HbF.

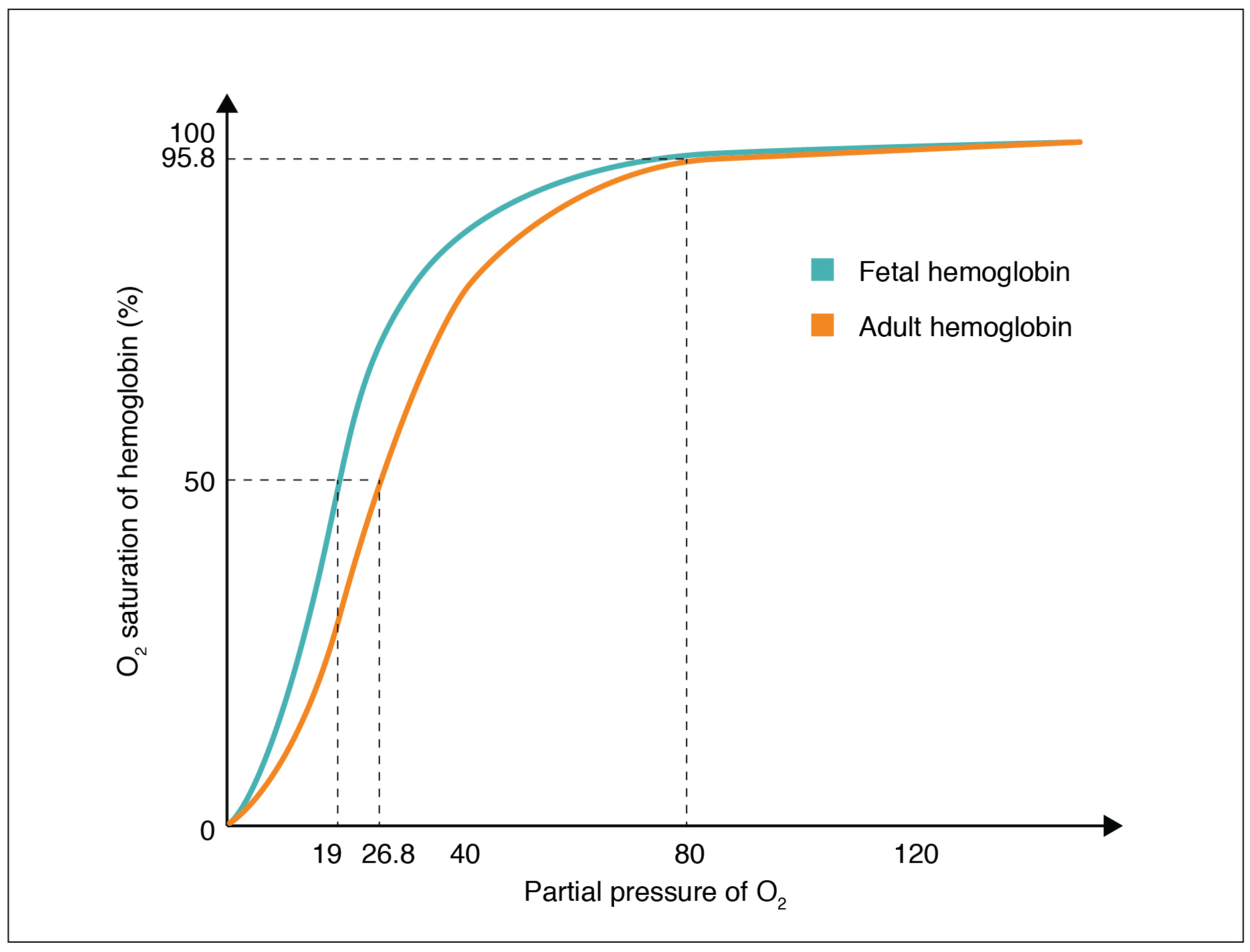
Graph comparing oxygen affinities between fetal hemoglobin (HbF) and adult hemoglobin A (HbA). Differences in affinity are necessary for the proper development of the fetus from placental gas exchange.

Different chains also have varying affinities for one another, accomplished through differences in charge. Globin chains are held together at tetramer-dimer interfaces, which vary in strength depending on the combination of chains. As development transitions from one stage to the next, globin chains will compete with one another to tetramize into hemoglobin. Later stage development globin chains having stronger affinity, allowing for a smooth transition between hemoglobin types as the higher affinity new globin chains outcompete the lower affinity globin chains from the previous developmental stage.

The affinity of the ferrous iron for oxygen is also reliant on the type of globin chain that composes the hemoglobin. Embryonic phase hemoglobins have a very high affinity for oxygen in comparison to those of later developmental stages; this is necessary for the growing fetus to adapt to both its changing environment and its own changing physiology. The vast number of environmental conditions it must account for at this stage of development is the reasoning behind the embryonic stage possessing the most types of hemoglobin - each serves a different purpose to allow for oxygen transport. Diffusional oxygen transport in the amniotic fluid to placental circulation is just an example of the dramatic environmental changes faced by the embryo in this early stage of life. As the embryo develops into a fetus and the circulatory system takes shape, these embryonic hemoglobins are discarded in favor of more mature hemoglobins, although the specialized fetal hemoglobin (HbF) is still an adaptation for the fetus' dependency on placental blood for gas exchange. The fetal hemoglobin necessarily needs to have higher affinity for oxygen in order to outcompete their mother's adult hemoglobin for oxygen. Finally, as the development continues and birth occurs, the higher HbF oxygen affinity is no longer a necessity as the baby can now supply its own oxygen, leading to a final transition to the adult hemoglobin variants.

== Timing and localization ==
ϵ-globin, is first found in the yolk sac from the first three to eight weeks of pregnancy. ϵ-globin production drops off while there is a sharp increase in fetal hemoglobin (HbF) beyond the sixth week of pregnancy. HbF is first found in the liver starting from week six lasting week thirty, then in the spleen from weeks nine to twenty-eight, and finally in the bone marrow from weeks twenty eight to birth. After birth, most of the HbF is replaced by HbA by six to twelve months of age. In adults, the β- and δ-globins are produced in the bone marrow.

In transgenic mice with the human β-globin gene cluster, ϵ-globin and HbA from the γ-genes are expressed in the embryonic yolk sac stage. The γ-genes are also expressed in the fetal liver and adult bone marrow while β-globin is only expressed during the fetal liver and adult bone marrow.

== Evolution ==
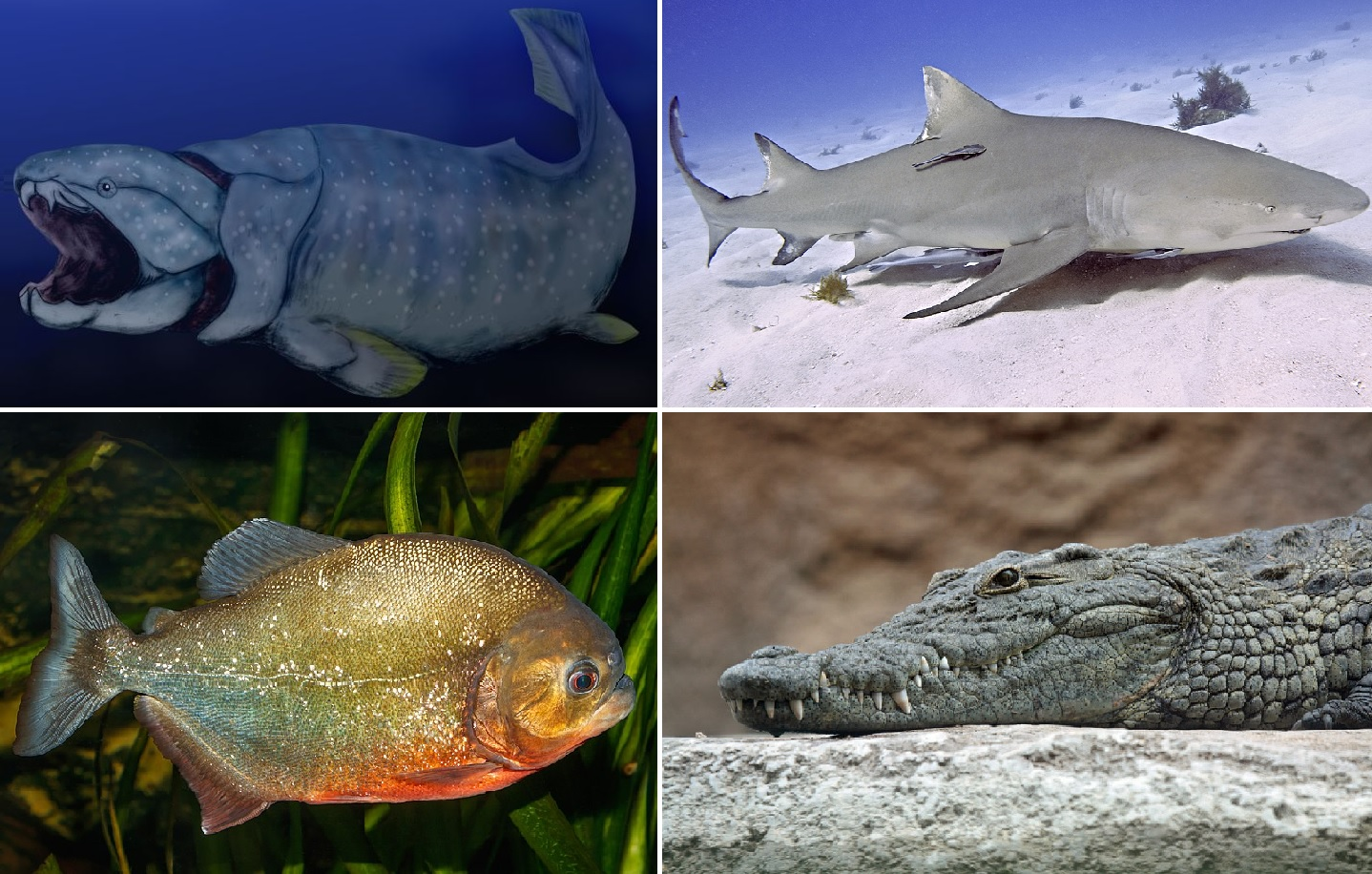
Several examples of gnathostomes: Dunkleosteus (Placodermi), Spotted wobbegong (Chondrichthyes), Silver arowana (Actinopterygii) and a Nile crocodile (Tetrapoda)

The genes of premature β-like globins, ϵ-globin and HbA, are not unique to humans and similar analogs can be found in all jawed vertebrates. All jawed vertebrates are capable of producing an embryonic specific globin in the yolk sac and adult hemoglobin in the bone marrow but only some species are able to produce a fetal globin that is formed in the liver. Notably, the β-globin locus belonging to birds are distinct from those found in mammals suggesting a shared ancestor or convergent evolution.

In most amniotes, the β-like globin genes and the ɑ-like globin genes are located on different chromosomes requiring coordination of expression to maintain a balance. For fish species, however, orthologs of the ɑ-like globin gene cluster contains both the β-like globin genes and the ɑ-like globin genes on the same chromosome. The larger cluster also requires its ɑ and β components to be differentially expressed during development.

ɑ-like and β-like genes can found in the locus LA found between the three genes LCMT1, AQP8, and ARHGAP17 in species of fish. However, in humans, platypus, chickens, and frogs, the globin genes are missing from LA suggesting either the common ancestor of jawed vertebrates had ɑ-like and β-like genes and tetrapods lost them or that the globin genes were novelly introduced into that region. In another locus MN between genes MPG and NPRL3, placental mammals and chickens only have ɑ-like globin genes whereas platypus and marsupials have ɑ-like and β-like globin genes in the region. Regardless of the difference, with the presence of globin genes in MN, it is highly likely that the last common ancestor of vertebrates had globin genes at the MN locus.

In terms of the evolution of the genes themselves, cyclostomes which include lamprey and hagfish have only a single globin chain type while carp have both ɑ- and β-globin chains suggesting that the evolution that gave rise to the two types occurred around the time of bony fish roughly 500 million years ago. The differentiation of the fetal and embryonic genes from β-globin genes likely occurred 200 million years ago. This is corroborated by the fact that this is the time period after reptiles evolved to become mammals 300 million years ago. By means of measuring the amount of base pair difference between the genes, a Poisson distribution was used to estimate that the time of evolution that produced the β and δ genes was likely 40 million years ago and the divergence of the fetal from the embryonic genes likely occurred 100 million years ago.

== Mutations and Disease ==
Mutations in the HBB locus are responsible for several prevalent diseases affecting red blood cells. These diseases are almost always linked to several known mutations, and thus the genetic cause varies on a case to case basis.

=== Sickle Cell Disease ===
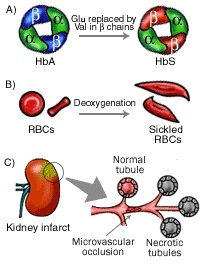
A missense mutation results in abnormal hemoglobin S. This causes RBCs to distort into sickled shapes that can block small vessels and cause tissue damage.

The genetic basis for the sickling of red blood cells (RBC) is a point mutation in the β-gene, which is responsible for the production of β-globin chains. β-globin chains, in conjunction with α-globin chains, form hemoglobin A (HbA), which accounts for about 97% of total RBC hemoglobin in adults. The mutations responsible for sickle cell anemia result in the production of abnormal β-globin chain proteins, resulting in an abnormal hemoglobin termed hemoglobin S (HbS). Several different point mutations have been characterized that can disrupt the production of healthy β-globin chains, resulting in this abnormal HbS. Of these, the most well studied is the Glutamic acid to Valine amino acid substitution, resulting from a point mutation (A to T) at position 6 of the β-globin gene. Humans carry two copies of the β-gene, but as long as one copy is normal, the individual will exhibit little to no symptoms of sickle cell anemia, given that the body still produces healthy, normal functioning HbA. Thus, the disease generally only manifests in homozygous individuals with two mutant copies of the β-gene (i.e. the mutation is autosomal recessive).

=== Beta Thalassemia ===
As opposed to sickle cell anemia, where due to mutation the resulting β-globin chain is abnormal, the mutations that cause beta thalassemia result in either very little or no β-chains being produced at all. In general, these two cases are differentiated by the beta-plus and beta-zero designations, for reduced β-globin chain production and no β-globin chain production respectively. However, rare cases exist where β-globin chains are produced, but are unable to form hemoglobin A, rendering them functionally useless. In all cases, the ultimate consequence is the lack of sufficient hemoglobin A, resulting in anemia and associated complications. These symptoms can be amplified with co-inheritance of other globin chain mutations, such as alpha thalassemia. Like in sickle cell anemia, there is no one mutation responsible for beta thalassemia; several mutations or combinations of mutations to the β-gene are responsible. Beta thalassemia also shows an autosomal recessive inheritance pattern for the same reasons as sickle cell anemia. However, unlike sickle cell anemia, several mutation types can be responsible, ranging from point mutations to insertions/deletions of varying sizes. Although the majority of indel mutations are small, it is also possible for nearly the entire beta globin locus and LCR to be affected. Mutations in β-gene regulatory sequences are another prevalent driver of beta thalassemia, given the potential for errors in these regions to result in truncated or completely absent β-globin chains.

== Drugs and Treatments ==
Chronic blood transfusions is a common therapeutic option for treating sickle cell anemia by way of improving oxygen delivery and reducing complications such as vaso-occlusive crisis which are common to the disease. However, in the case of uncomplicated VOCs, blood transfusion is not recommended as it has shown little effectiveness in the course of hospitalization. Stroke is also a common manifestation of sickle cell anemia with 11% of patients experiencing at least one stroke before the age of 20 with a 70% chance of recurrence within 2 years from the first stroke.

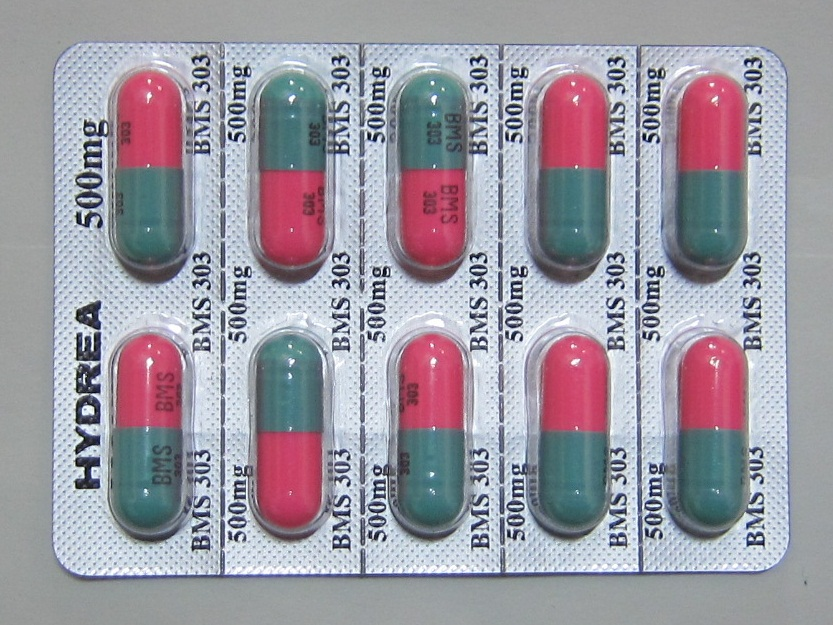
HYDREA 500mg Capsule (Packing for Japan)

Major drug options include Hydroxyurea and Voxelotor. Hydroxyurea is a FDA-approved drug used to treat sickle cell anemia by inhibiting HbS polymerization. Clinically, it is thought that Hydroxyurea induces the production of fetal hemoglobin (HbF) which are less susceptible to sickle formation due to their difference in structure from hemoglobin S (HbS). This in turn dilutes the concentration of HbS, allowing red blood cells to exit peripheral capillaries before sickling begins — though the exact mechanism behind HbF induction remains unknown.

Voxelotor is another FDA-approved drug option. It reduces the effective amount of HbS by binding to the non polymerizing R conformation thereby reducing the concentration of the polymerizing T conformation concentration. However, it is worth noting that HbS bound to Voxelotor have very little oxygen carrying capacity so the effectiveness as opposed to not using the drug in the first place is not very apparent.

More universal approaches to treating mutations in the β-globin genes include two cell-based gene therapy options, Casgevy and Lyfgenia, which were approved by the FDA in 2023. Casgevy makes use of CRISPR-Cas9 to edit blood stem cells which are then transplanted back into patients allowing for the production of fetal hemoglobin (HbF). Lyfgenia uses a lentiviral vector to modify blood stem cells to produce adult hemoglobin (HbA) which is also transplanted in a similar fashion.
