= HBG2 =

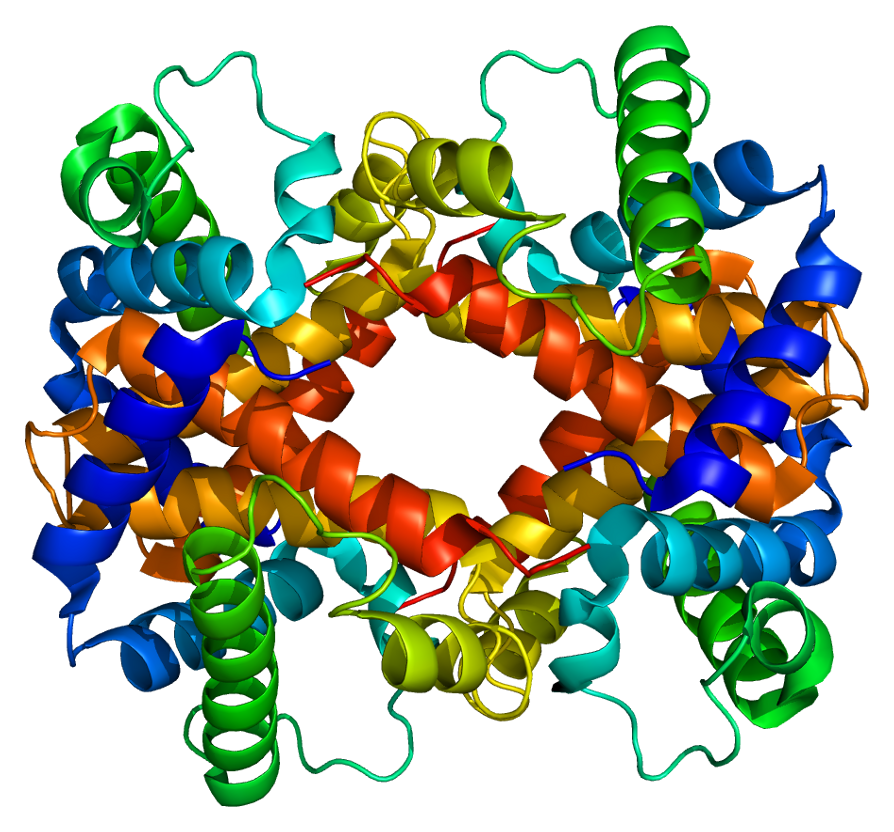
Available structures
PDB	Ortholog search: PDBe RCSB
PDB	List of PDB id codes 1FDH, 4MQJ, 4MQK

Identifiers
- Aliases: HBG2, HBG-T1, TNCY, hemoglobin subunit gamma 2
- External IDs: OMIM: 142250; MGI: 96027; HomoloGene: 128032; GeneCards: HBG2; OMA:HBG2 - orthologs

Gene location (Human)
Chr.	Chromosome 11 (human)
Band	11p15.4	Start	5,253,188 bp
Band	11p15.4	End	5,505,605 bp

Gene location (Mouse)
Chr.	Chromosome 7 (mouse)
Band	7 E3|7 54.85 cM	Start	103,500,956 bp
Band	7 E3|7 54.85 cM	End	103,502,423 bp
RNA expression pattern
Bgee	Human / Mouse (ortholog); Top expressed in: placenta; ganglionic eminence; ventricular zone; blood; monocyte; bone marrow; bone marrow cells; apex of heart; spleen; lung / Top expressed in: external carotid artery; internal carotid artery; endocardial cushion; abdominal wall; maxillary prominence; mandibular prominence; somite; hand; human fetus; yolk sac; More reference expression data
BioGPS	n/a
Gene ontology
Molecular function	iron ion binding; oxygen carrier activity; heme binding; metal ion binding; oxygen binding; peroxidase activity; protein binding; haptoglobin binding; organic acid binding
Cellular component	blood microparticle; hemoglobin complex; cytosol; haptoglobin-hemoglobin complex
Biological process	oxygen transport; blood coagulation; transport; hydrogen peroxide catabolic process; protein heterooligomerization; cellular oxidant detoxification
Sources:Amigo / QuickGO
Orthologs
Species	Human	Mouse
Entrez	3048	15135
Ensembl	ENSG00000196565	ENSMUSG00000052187
UniProt	P69892	P02104
RefSeq (mRNA)	NM_000184	NM_008221
RefSeq (protein)	NP_000175	NP_032247
Location (UCSC)	Chr 11: 5.25 – 5.51 Mb	Chr 7: 103.5 – 103.5 Mb
PubMed search
- Wikidata
View/Edit Human	View/Edit Mouse

Hemoglobin subunit gamma-2 is a protein that in humans is encoded by the HBG2 gene.

== Function ==
The gamma globin genes (HBG1 and HBG2, this gene) are normally expressed in the fetal liver, spleen and bone marrow. Two gamma chains together with two alpha chains constitute fetal hemoglobin (HbF) which is normally replaced by adult hemoglobin (HbA) at birth. In some beta-thalassemias and related conditions, gamma chain production continues into adulthood. The two types of gamma chains differ at residue 136 where glycine is found in the G-gamma product (HBG2) and alanine is found in the A-gamma product (HBG1). The former is predominant at birth. The order of the genes in the beta-globin cluster is: 5' - epsilon – gamma-G – gamma-A – delta – beta - 3'.
