= Hemoglobin subunit beta =

Mammalian protein found in Homo sapiens

HBB
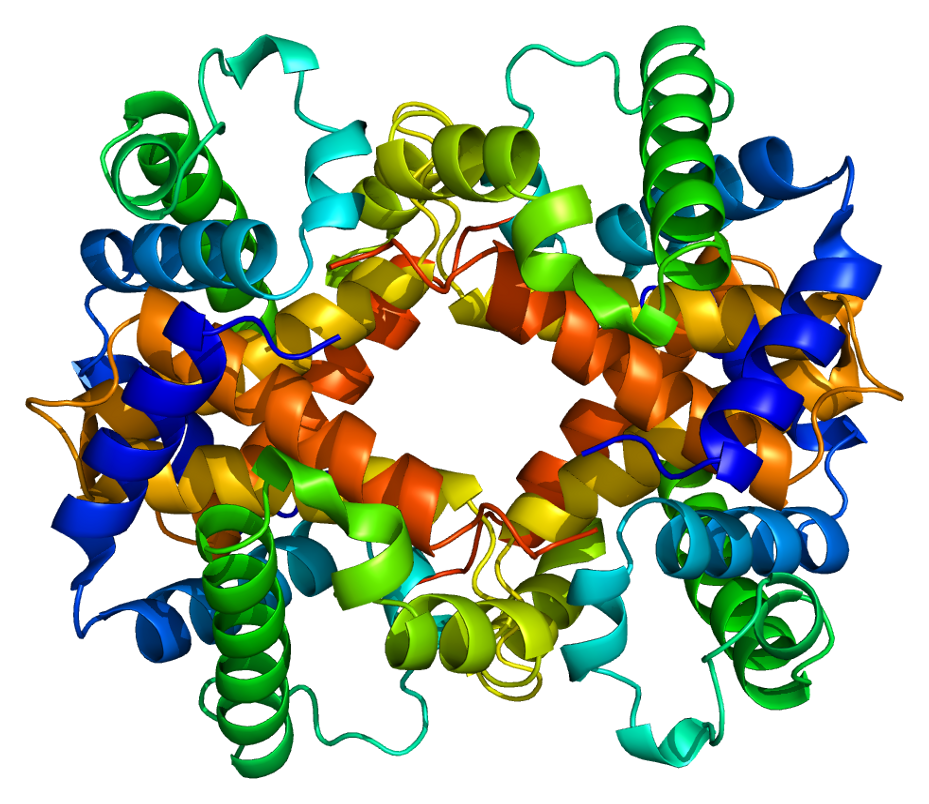

Identifiers
- Aliases: HBB, CD113t-C, beta-globin, hemoglobin subunit beta, ECYT6
- External IDs: OMIM: 141900; MGI: 5474850; GeneCards: HBB
Available structures
PDB	Ortholog search: PDBe RCSB
PDB	List of PDB id codes 6HBW, 1A00, 1A01, 1A0U, 1A0Z, 1A3N, 1A3O, 1ABW, 1ABY, 1AJ9, 1B86, 1BAB, 1BBB, 1BIJ, 1BUW, 1BZ0, 1BZ1, 1BZZ, 1C7B, 1C7C, 1C7D, 1CBL, 1CBM, 1CH4, 1CLS, 1CMY, 1COH, 1DKE, 1DXT, 1DXU, 1DXV, 1FN3, 1G9V, 1GBU, 1GBV, 1GLI, 1GZX, 1HAB, 1HAC, 1HBA, 1HBB, 1HBS, 1HCO, 1HDB, 1HGA, 1HGB, 1HGC, 1HHO, 1IRD, 1J3Y, 1J3Z, 1J40, 1J41, 1J7S, 1J7W, 1J7Y, 1JY7, 1K0Y, 1K1K, 1KD2, 1LFL, 1LFQ, 1LFT, 1LFV, 1LFY, 1LFZ, 1LJW, 1M9P, 1MKO, 1NEJ, 1NIH, 1NQP, 1O1I, 1O1J, 1O1K, 1O1L, 1O1M, 1O1N, 1O1O, 1O1P, 1QI8, 1QSH, 1QSI, 1QXD, 1QXE, 1R1X, 1R1Y, 1RPS, 1RQ3, 1RQ4, 1RQA, 1RVW, 1SDK, 1SDL, 1THB, 1UIW, 1VWT, 1XXT, 1XY0, 1XYE, 1XZ2, 1XZ4, 1XZ5, 1XZ7, 1XZU, 1XZV, 1Y09, 1Y0A, 1Y0C, 1Y0D, 1Y0T, 1Y0W, 1Y22, 1Y2Z, 1Y31, 1Y35, 1Y45, 1Y46, 1Y4B, 1Y4F, 1Y4G, 1Y4P, 1Y4Q, 1Y4R, 1Y4V, 1Y5F, 1Y5J, 1Y5K, 1Y7C, 1Y7D, 1Y7G, 1Y7Z, 1Y83, 1Y85, 1Y8W, 1YDZ, 1YE0, 1YE1, 1YE2, 1YEN, 1YEO, 1YEQ, 1YEU, 1YEV, 1YFF, 1YG5, 1YGD, 1YGF, 1YH9, 1YHE, 1YHR, 1YIE, 1YIH, 1YVQ, 1YVT, 1YZI, 2D5Z, 2D60, 2DN1, 2DN2, 2DN3, 2DXM, 2H35, 2HBC, 2HBD, 2HBE, 2HBF, 2HBS, 2HCO, 2HHD, 2HHE, 2M6Z, 2W6V, 2W72, 2YRS, 3B75, 3D17, 3D7O, 3DUT, 3HXN, 3IC0, 3IC2, 3KMF, 3NL7, 3NMM, 3ODQ, 3ONZ, 3OO4, 3OO5, 3P5Q, 3QJB, 3QJC, 3QJD, 3QJE, 3R5I, 3S65, 3S66, 3SZK, 3W4U, 3WCP, 3WHM, 4FC3, 4HHB, 4IJ2, 4L7Y, 4M4A, 4M4B, 4MQC, 4MQG, 4MQH, 4MQI, 4N7N, 4N7O, 4N7P, 4N8T, 4NI0, 4NI1, 4ROL, 4ROM, 4WJG, 4X0L, 4XS0, 5E29, 5E6E, 5EE4, 5HU6, 5JDO, 5KDQ, 5E83

Gene location (Human)
Chr.	Chromosome 11 (human)
Band	11p15.4	Start	5,225,464 bp
Band	11p15.4	End	5,229,395 bp

Gene location (Mouse)
Chr.	Chromosome 7 (mouse)
Band	7 E3|7	Start	103,461,731 bp
Band	7 E3|7	End	103,463,203 bp
RNA expression pattern
Bgee	Human / Mouse (ortholog); Top expressed in: trabecular bone; vena cava; periodontal fiber; monocyte; bone marrow; triceps brachii muscle; Skeletal muscle tissue of biceps brachii; bone marrow cell; glutes; blood / Top expressed in: bone marrow; spleen; neural tube; heart; lung; ganglionic eminence; ventricular zone; mesencephalon; esophagus; zone of skin; More reference expression data
BioGPS	n/a
Gene ontology
Molecular function	iron ion binding; oxygen binding; oxygen carrier activity; peroxidase activity; metal ion binding; hemoglobin binding; protein binding; heme binding; haptoglobin binding
Cellular component	cytosol; endocytic vesicle lumen; blood microparticle; extracellular region; hemoglobin complex; extracellular exosome; haptoglobin-hemoglobin complex; tertiary granule lumen; ficolin-1-rich granule lumen; extracellular space
Biological process	positive regulation of cell death; protein heterooligomerization; nitric oxide transport; positive regulation of nitric oxide biosynthetic process; oxygen transport; blood coagulation; receptor-mediated endocytosis; regulation of blood pressure; bicarbonate transport; hydrogen peroxide catabolic process; platelet aggregation; response to hydrogen peroxide; renal absorption; cellular oxidant detoxification; neutrophil degranulation; transport
Sources:Amigo / QuickGO
Orthologs
Databases	NCBI: entry; OMA: entry
Species	Human	Mouse
Entrez	3043	101488143
Ensembl	ENSG00000244734	ENSMUSG00000073940
UniProt	P68871	P02088
RefSeq (mRNA)	NM_000518	NM_008220
RefSeq (protein)	NP_000509	NP_032246; NP_001188320; NP_001265090
Location (UCSC)	Chr 11: 5.23 – 5.23 Mb	Chr 7: 103.46 – 103.46 Mb
PubMed search
- Wikidata
View/Edit Human	View/Edit Mouse

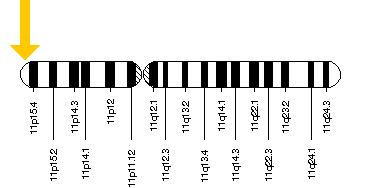
In human, the HBB gene is located on chromosome 11 at position p15.4.

Hemoglobin subunit beta (beta globin, β-globin, haemoglobin beta, hemoglobin beta) is a globin protein, coded for by the HBB gene, which along with alpha globin (HBA), makes up the most common form of haemoglobin in adult humans, hemoglobin A (HbA). It is 147 amino acids long and has a molecular weight of 15,867 Da. Normal adult human HbA is a heterotetramer consisting of two alpha chains and two beta chains.

β-globin is encoded by the HBB gene on human chromosome 11. Mutations in the gene produce several variants of the proteins which are implicated with genetic disorders such as sickle-cell disease and beta thalassemia, as well as beneficial traits such as genetic resistance to malaria. At least 50 disease-causing mutations in this gene have been discovered.

== Gene locus ==
Beta-globin is produced by the gene HBB which is located in the multigene locus of β-globin locus on chromosome 11, specifically on the short arm position 15.4. Expression of beta globin and the neighbouring globins in the β-globin locus is controlled by single locus control region (LCR), the most important regulatory element in the locus located upstream of the globin genes. The normal allelic variant is 1600 base pairs (bp) long and contains three exons. The order of the genes in the beta-globin cluster is 5' - epsilon – gamma-G – gamma-A – delta – beta - 3'.

== Interactions ==
Beta-globin interacts with alpha-globin to form haemoglobin A, the major haemoglobin in adult humans. The interaction is two-fold. First, one β-globin molecule and one α-globin molecule combine by electrostatic attraction to form a dimer. Secondly, two dimers combine to form the four-chain tetramer, and this becomes the functional haemoglobin.

== Associated genetic disorders ==
=== Beta thalassemia ===
Beta thalassemia is an inherited genetic mutation in one (Beta thalassemia minor) or both (Beta thalassemia major) of the Beta globin alleles on chromosome 11. The mutant alleles are subdivided into two groups: β0, in which no functional β-globin is made, and β+, in which a small amount of normal β-globin protein is produced. Beta thalassemia minor occurs when an individual inherits one normal Beta allele and one abnormal Beta allele (either β0, or β+). Beta thalassemia minor results in a mild microcytic anemia that is often asymptomatic or may cause fatigue and or pale skin. Beta thalassemia major occurs when a person inherits two abnormal alleles. This can be either two β+ alleles, two β0 alleles, or one of each. Beta thalassemia major is a severe medical condition. A severe anemia is seen starting at 6 months of age. Without medical treatment death often occurs before age 12. Beta thalassemia major can be treated by lifelong blood transfusions or bone marrow transplantation.

=== Sickle cell disease ===
More than a thousand naturally occurring HBB variants have been discovered. The most common is HbS, which causes sickle cell disease. HbS is produced by a point mutation in HBB in which the codon GAG is replaced by GTG. This results in the replacement of hydrophilic amino acid glutamic acid with the hydrophobic amino acid valine at the seventh position (β6Glu→Val). This substitution creates a hydrophobic spot on the outside of the protein that sticks to the hydrophobic region of an adjacent hemoglobin molecule's beta chain. This further causes clumping of HbS molecules into rigid fibers, causing "sickling" of the entire red blood cells in the homozygous (HbS/HbS) condition. The homozygous allele has become one of the deadliest genetic factors, whereas people heterozygous for the mutant allele (HbS/HbA) are resistant to malaria and develop minimal effects of the anaemia.

=== Haemoglobin C ===
Sickle cell disease is closely related to another mutant haemoglobin called haemoglobin C (HbC), because they can be inherited together. HbC mutation is at the same position in HbS, but glutamic acid is replaced by lysine (β6Glu→Lys). The mutation is particularly prevalent in West African populations. HbC provides near full protection against Plasmodium falciparum in homozygous (CC) individuals and intermediate protection in heterozygous (AC) individuals. This indicates that HbC has stronger influence than HbS, and is predicted to replace HbS in malaria-endemic regions.

=== Haemoglobin E ===
Another point mutation in HBB, in which glutamic acid is replaced with lysine at position 26 (β26Glu→Lys), leads to the formation of haemoglobin E (HbE). HbE has a very unstable α- and β-globin association. Even though the unstable protein itself has mild effect, inherited with HbS and thalassemia traits, it turns into a life-threatening form of β-thalassemia. The mutation is of relatively recent origin suggesting that it resulted from selective pressure against severe falciparum malaria, as heterozygous allele prevents the development of malaria.

== Human evolution ==
Malaria due to Plasmodium falciparum is a major selective factor in human evolution. It has influenced mutations in HBB in various degrees resulting in the existence of numerous HBB variants. Some of these mutations are not directly lethal and instead confer resistance to malaria, particularly in parts of the world where malaria is epidemic. For example, there is evidence that the sickle cell mutation, common in people of African descent, provides a degree of resistance to severe malaria. Thus, HBB mutations are the sources of positive selection in these regions and are important for their long-term survival. Such selection markers are important for tracing human ancestry and diversification from Africa.

== See also ==
- Hemoglobin subunit alpha
- Human β-globin locus
