= Vaso-occlusive crisis =

Form of sickle cell crisis in sickle cell anaemia

- Specialty: Angiology
- Symptoms: acute, severe pain
- Diagnostic method: There is no test to confirm a vaso-occlusive crisis, but tests can be done to rule out other causes. Patients with vaso-occlusive crisis present with pain (mild to severe) and a history of sickle cell anemia.
- Differential diagnosis: Neuropathic pain, hyperalgesia, osteomyelitis

A vaso-occlusive crisis is a common painful complication of sickle cell anemia in adolescents and adults. It is a form of sickle cell crisis. Sickle cell anemia – most common in those of African, Hispanic, and Mediterranean origin – leads to sickle cell crisis when the circulation of blood vessels is obstructed by sickled red blood cells, causing ischemic injuries. The most common complaint is of pain, and recurrent episodes may cause irreversible organ damage. One of the most severe forms is the acute chest syndrome which occurs as a result of infarction of the lung parenchyma. This can rapidly result in death. Other types of vaso-occlusive crisis in sickle cell anemia include dactylitis, priapism, abdominal pain, and jaundice.

== Diagnosis ==
Diagnosis of vaso-occlusive crisis is based on clinical manifestations, complete blood count with white blood cell differential, platelet count, reticulocyte count, and comprehensive metabolic panel with liver and kidney function tests. Typical lab findings include acute drop in hemoglobin concentration, increased platelet count, increased reticulocyte count, and elevated serum urea.

== Management ==
The management of an acute event of vaso-occlusive crisis is the use of potent analgesics (opioids), rehydration with normal saline or Ringer's lactate, treatment of malaria (whether symptomatic or not) using artemisinin combination therapy, and the use of oxygen via face mask, especially for acute chest syndrome. Hyperbaric oxygen has also been shown to be a useful adjunct in pain reduction.
