= HBG1 =

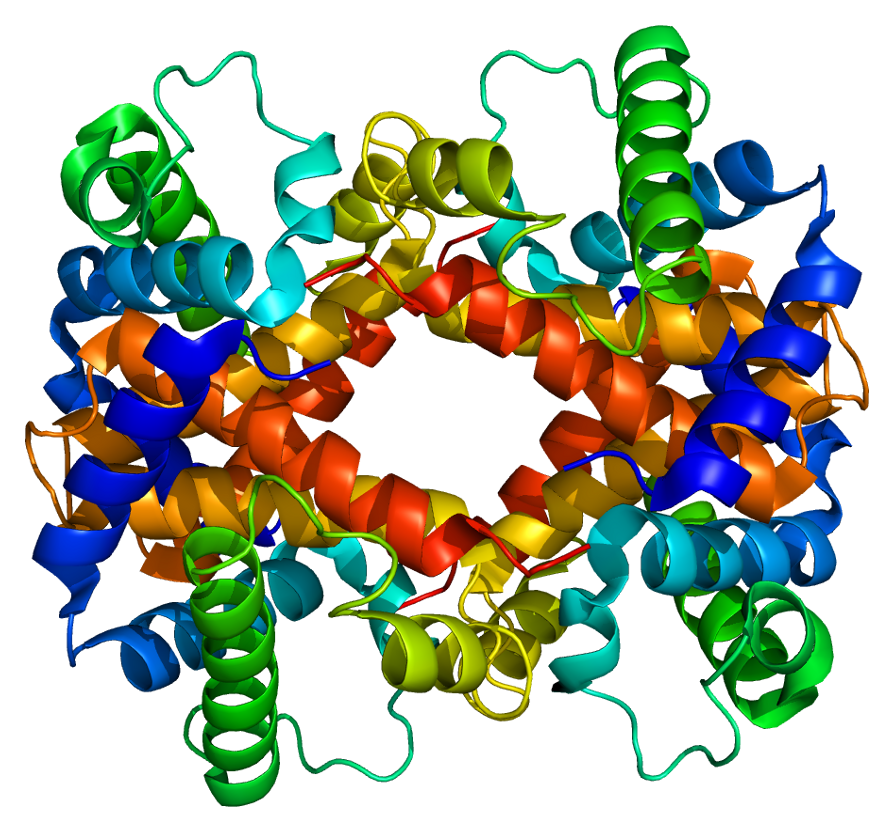
Available structures
PDB	Human UniProt search: PDBe RCSB
PDB	List of PDB id codes 1I3D, 1I3E

Identifiers
- Aliases: HBG1, HBG-T2, HBGA, HBGR, HSGGL1, PRO2979, hemoglobin subunit gamma 1
- External IDs: OMIM: 142200; HomoloGene: 133561; GeneCards: HBG1; OMA:HBG1 - orthologs

Gene location (Human)
Chr.	Chromosome 11 (human)
Band	11p15.4	Start	5,248,269 bp
Band	11p15.4	End	5,249,857 bp
RNA expression pattern
Bgee	Human / Mouse (ortholog); Top expressed in: placenta; blood; testicle; ganglionic eminence; monocyte; bone marrow cells; ventricular zone; gastric mucosa; gastrocnemius muscle; left ventricle / n/a; More reference expression data
BioGPS	n/a
Gene ontology
Molecular function	oxygen binding; heme binding; metal ion binding; oxygen carrier activity; peroxidase activity; protein binding; haptoglobin binding; organic acid binding
Cellular component	hemoglobin complex; cytosol; haptoglobin-hemoglobin complex
Biological process	blood coagulation; oxygen transport; hydrogen peroxide catabolic process; protein heterooligomerization; cellular oxidant detoxification
Sources:Amigo / QuickGO
Orthologs
Species	Human	Mouse
Entrez	3047	n/a
Ensembl	ENSG00000213934	n/a
UniProt	P69891	n/a
RefSeq (mRNA)	NM_000559	n/a
RefSeq (protein)	NP_000550	n/a
Location (UCSC)	Chr 11: 5.25 – 5.25 Mb	n/a
PubMed search		n/a
- Wikidata
View/Edit Human

Hemoglobin subunit gamma-1 is a protein that in humans is encoded by the HBG1 gene.

== Function ==
The gamma globin genes (HBG1 and HBG2) are normally expressed in the fetal liver, spleen and bone marrow. Two gamma chains together with two alpha chains constitute fetal hemoglobin (HbF) which is normally replaced by adult hemoglobin (HbA) in the year following birth. In the non-pathological condition known as hereditary persistence of fetal hemoglobin (HPFH), gamma globin expression is continued into adulthood. Also, in cases of beta-thalassemia and related conditions, gamma chain production may be maintained, possibly as a mechanism to compensate for the mutated beta-globin. The two types of gamma chains differ at residue 136 where glycine is found in the G-gamma product (HBG2) and alanine is found in the A-gamma product (HBG1). The former is predominant at birth. The order of the genes in the beta-globin cluster is: 5' - epsilon – gamma-G – gamma-A – delta – beta - 3'.
