= Hemoglobin subunit alpha =

Human hemoglobin protein

HBA1
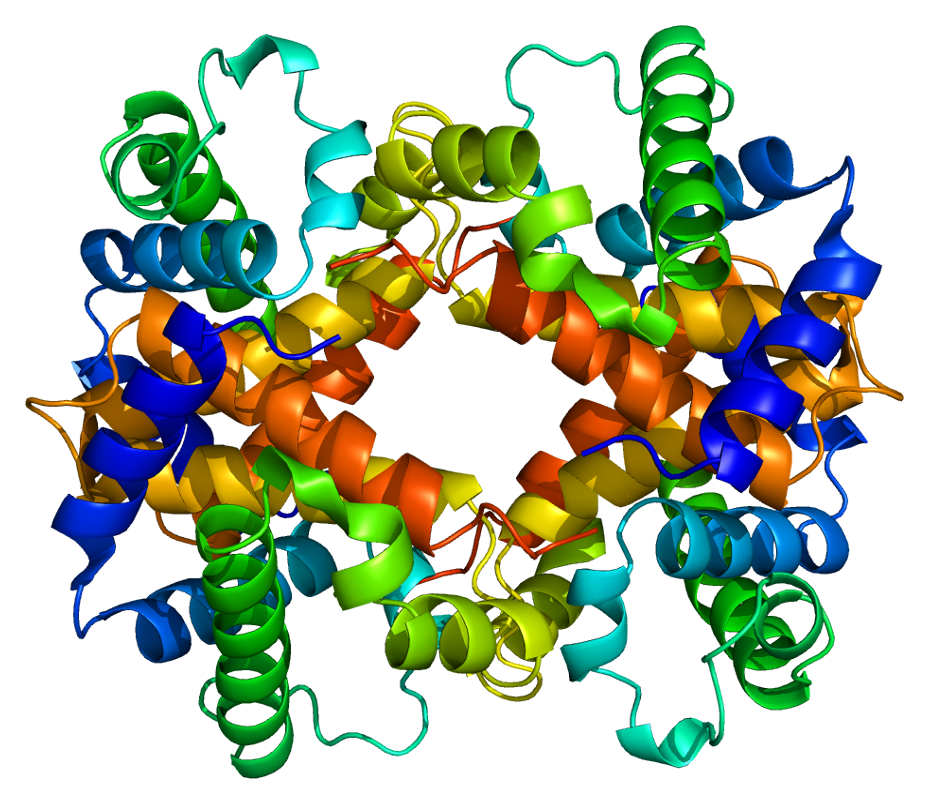

Identifiers
- Aliases: HBA1, HBA-T3, HBH, hemoglobin subunit alpha 1, METHBA, ECYT7
- External IDs: OMIM: 141800; MGI: 96015; GeneCards: HBA1
Available structures
PDB	Ortholog search: PDBe RCSB
PDB	List of PDB id codes 1A00, 1A01, 1A0U, 1A0Z, 1A3N, 1A3O, 1A9W, 1ABW, 1ABY, 1AJ9, 1B86, 1BAB, 1BBB, 1BIJ, 1BUW, 1BZ0, 1BZ1, 1BZZ, 1C7B, 1C7C, 1C7D, 1CLS, 1CMY, 1COH, 1DKE, 1DXT, 1DXU, 1DXV, 1FDH, 1FN3, 1G9V, 1GBU, 1GBV, 1GLI, 1GZX, 1HAB, 1HAC, 1HBA, 1HBB, 1HBS, 1HCO, 1HDB, 1HGA, 1HGB, 1HGC, 1HHO, 1IRD, 1J3Y, 1J3Z, 1J40, 1J41, 1J7S, 1J7W, 1J7Y, 1JY7, 1K0Y, 1K1K, 1KD2, 1LFL, 1LFQ, 1LFT, 1LFV, 1LFY, 1LFZ, 1LJW, 1M9P, 1MKO, 1NEJ, 1NIH, 1NQP, 1O1I, 1O1J, 1O1K, 1O1L, 1O1M, 1O1N, 1O1O, 1O1P, 1QI8, 1QSH, 1QSI, 1QXD, 1QXE, 1R1X, 1R1Y, 1RPS, 1RQ3, 1RQ4, 1RQA, 1RVW, 1SDK, 1SDL, 1SHR, 1SI4, 1THB, 1UIW, 1VWT, 1XXT, 1XY0, 1XYE, 1XZ2, 1XZ4, 1XZ5, 1XZ7, 1XZU, 1XZV, 1Y01, 1Y09, 1Y0A, 1Y0C, 1Y0D, 1Y0T, 1Y0W, 1Y22, 1Y2Z, 1Y31, 1Y35, 1Y45, 1Y46, 1Y4B, 1Y4F, 1Y4G, 1Y4P, 1Y4Q, 1Y4R, 1Y4V, 1Y5F, 1Y5J, 1Y5K, 1Y7C, 1Y7D, 1Y7G, 1Y7Z, 1Y83, 1Y85, 1Y8W, 1YDZ, 1YE0, 1YE1, 1YE2, 1YEN, 1YEO, 1YEQ, 1YEU, 1YEV, 1YFF, 1YG5, 1YGD, 1YGF, 1YH9, 1YHE, 1YHR, 1YIE, 1YIH, 1YVQ, 1YVT, 1YZI, 1Z8U, 2D5Z, 2D60, 2DN1, 2DN2, 2DN3, 2DXM, 2H35, 2HBC, 2HBD, 2HBE, 2HBF, 2HBS, 2HCO, 2HHD, 2HHE, 2M6Z, 2W6V, 2W72, 2YRS, 3B75, 3D17, 3D7O, 3DUT, 3HXN, 3IA3, 3IC0, 3IC2, 3KMF, 3NL7, 3NMM, 3ODQ, 3ONZ, 3OO4, 3OO5, 3OVU, 3P5Q, 3QJB, 3QJC, 3QJD, 3QJE, 3R5I, 3S48, 3S65, 3S66, 3SZK, 3WCP, 3WHM, 4FC3, 4HHB, 4IJ2, 4L7Y, 4M4A, 4M4B, 4MQC, 4MQG, 4MQH, 4MQI, 4MQJ, 4MQK, 4N7N, 4N7O, 4N7P, 4N8T, 4NI0, 4NI1, 4ROL, 4ROM, 4WJG, 4X0L, 4XS0, 6HBW, 5E29, 5E6E, 5EE4, 5HU6, 5JDO, 5KDQ, 5E83,%%s1Y01, 1Z8U, 1BZ1

Gene location (Human)
Chr.	Chromosome 16 (human)
Band	16p13.3	Start	176,680 bp
Band	16p13.3	End	177,522 bp

Gene location (Mouse)
Chr.	Chromosome 11 (mouse)
Band	11 A4|11 18.86 cM	Start	32,233,511 bp
Band	11 A4|11 18.86 cM	End	32,234,465 bp
RNA expression pattern
Bgee	Human / Mouse (ortholog); Top expressed in: monocyte; blood; bone marrow; bone marrow cell; placenta; spleen; ganglionic eminence; muscle of thigh; olfactory zone of nasal mucosa; apex of heart / Top expressed in: bone marrow; spleen; lung; yolk sac; neural tube; mesencephalon; heart; cerebellar cortex; genital tubercle; zone of skin; More reference expression data
BioGPS	n/a
Gene ontology
Molecular function	iron ion binding; oxygen binding; peroxidase activity; oxygen carrier activity; metal ion binding; protein binding; heme binding; haptoglobin binding; organic acid binding
Cellular component	cytosol; endocytic vesicle lumen; blood microparticle; membrane; extracellular region; cytosolic small ribosomal subunit; hemoglobin complex; extracellular exosome; haptoglobin-hemoglobin complex; extracellular space
Biological process	positive regulation of cell death; protein heterooligomerization; oxygen transport; receptor-mediated endocytosis; bicarbonate transport; hydrogen peroxide catabolic process; response to hydrogen peroxide; cellular oxidant detoxification; transport
Sources:Amigo / QuickGO
Orthologs
Databases	NCBI: entry; OMA: entry
Species	Human	Mouse
Entrez	3039	15122
Ensembl	ENSG00000206172	ENSMUSG00000069919
UniProt	P69905	Q91VB8
RefSeq (mRNA)	NM_000558	NM_008218
RefSeq (protein)	NP_000508; NP_000508.1; NP_000549.1	NP_001077424
Location (UCSC)	Chr 16: 0.18 – 0.18 Mb	Chr 11: 32.23 – 32.23 Mb
PubMed search
- Wikidata
View/Edit Human	View/Edit Mouse

Hemoglobin subunit alpha is a hemoglobin protein that in humans is encoded by the HBA1 and HBA2 genes.

== Gene ==
The human alpha globin gene cluster located on chromosome 16 spans about 30 kb and includes seven loci: 5'- zeta - pseudozeta - mu - pseudoalpha-1 - alpha-2 - alpha-1 - theta - 3'. The alpha-2 (HBA2) and alpha-1 (HBA1; this gene) coding sequences are identical. These genes differ slightly over the 5' untranslated regions and the introns, but they differ significantly over the 3' untranslated regions.

== Protein ==
The human alpha polypeptide chain contains 141 amino acids. Two alpha chains plus two beta chains constitute an HbA protein molecule, which in normal adult life accounts for about 97% of the total hemoglobin; alpha chains combine with delta chains to constitute HbA-2, which with fetal hemoglobin (HbF), composed of alpha and gamma chains, make up the remaining 3% of adult hemoglobin.

== Clinical significance ==
Alpha thalassemias result from deletions of each of the alpha genes as well as deletions of both HBA2 and HBA1; some nondeletion alpha thalassemias have also been reported.

== Interactions ==
Hemoglobin subunit alpha has been shown to interact with hemoglobin subunit beta (HBB).

== See also ==
- Hemoglobin subunit beta
- Human β-globin locus
