= Delta-beta thalassemia =

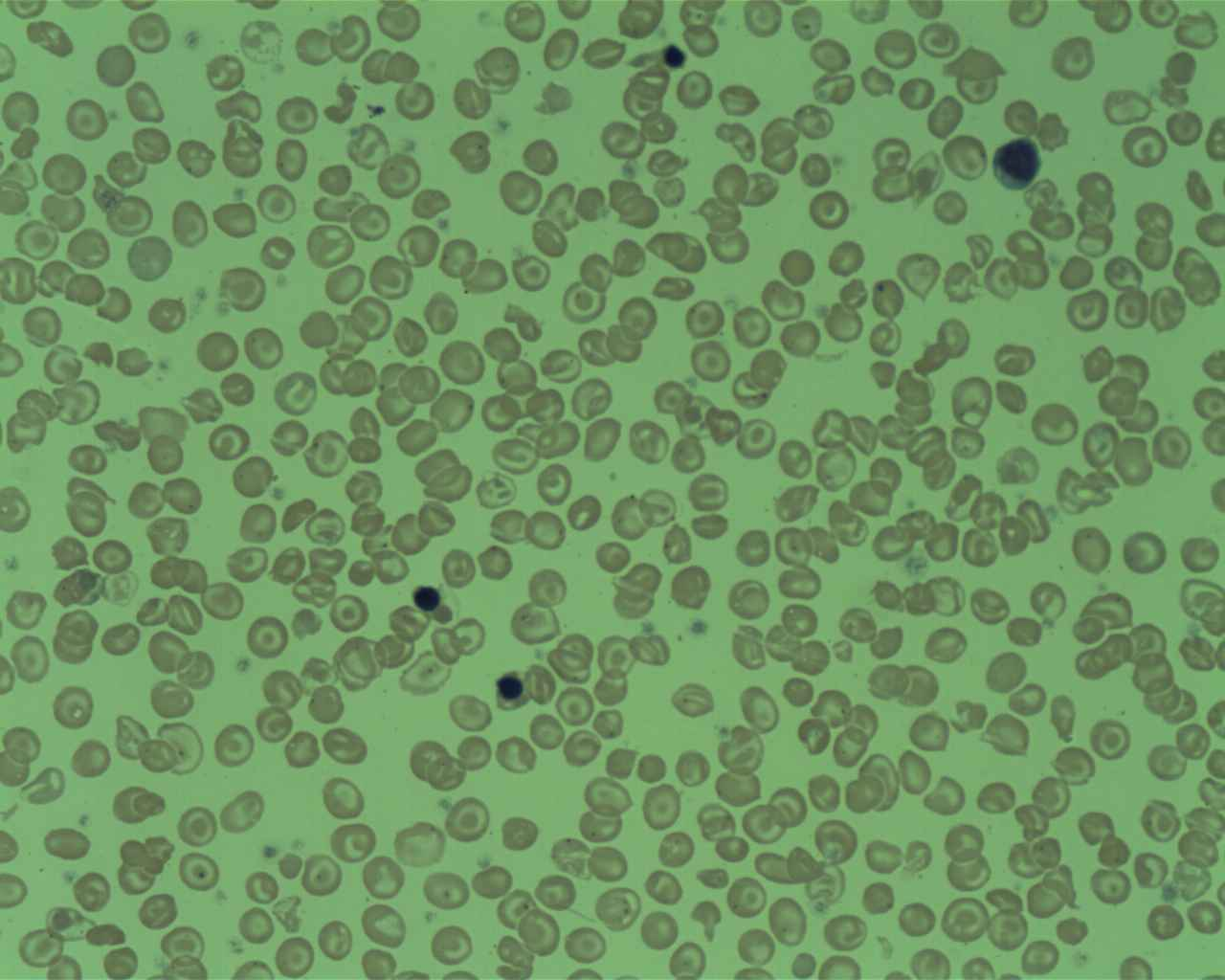
- Delta-beta thalassemia
- Specialty: Hematology
- Causes: Produces only gamma-globin and forms HbF(deletes entire delta and beta gene sequence)
- Diagnostic method: High-performance liquid chromatography
- Treatment: Blood transfusions

Delta-beta thalassemia is a rare form of thalassemia in which there is a reduced production of hemoglobin subunit delta and hemoglobin subunit beta and raised levels of hemoglobin subunit gamma. It is an autosomal recessive disorder.

== Signs and symptoms ==
An individual with delta-beta thalassemia is usually asymptomatic, however microcytosis can occur where the red blood cells are abnormally small.

== Mechanism ==
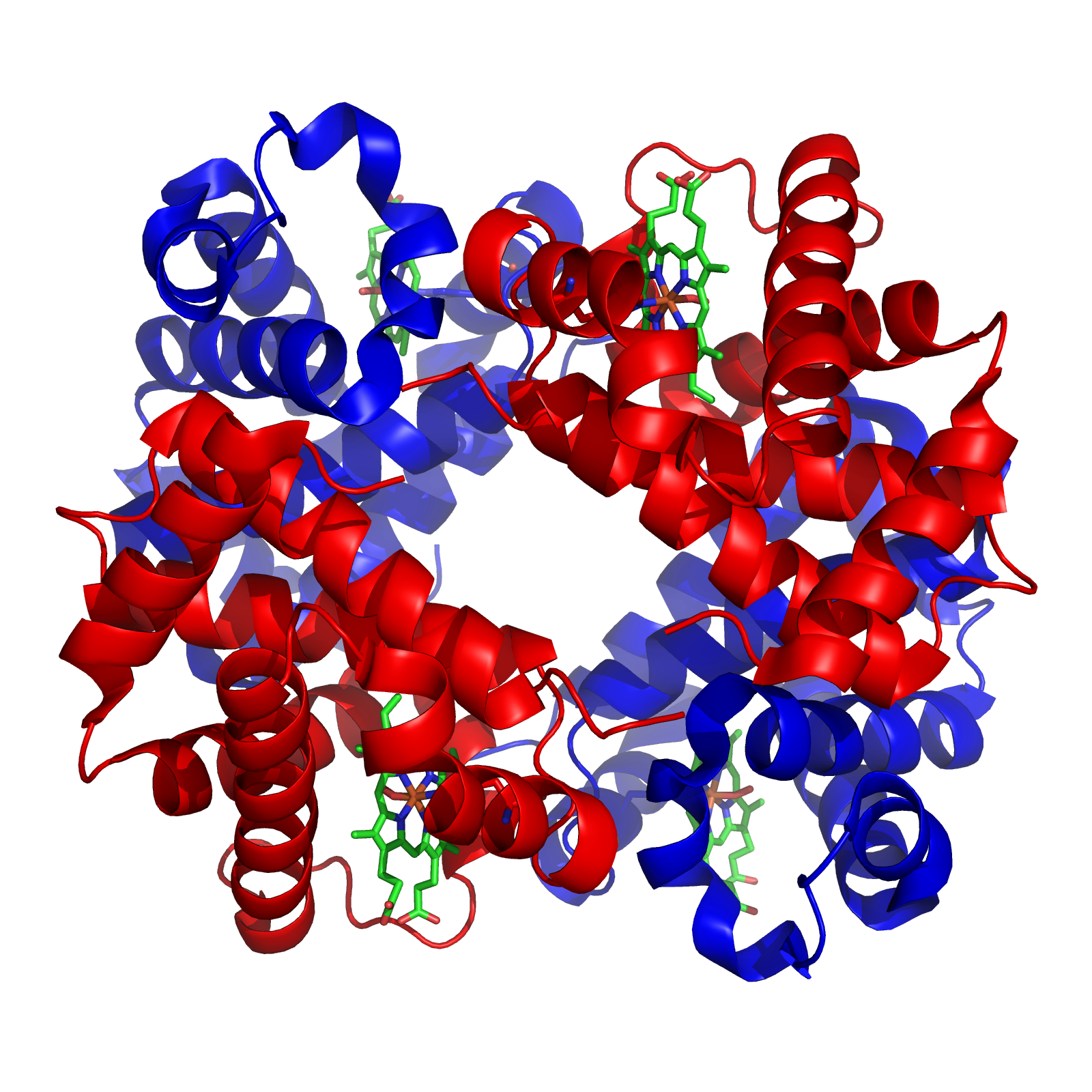
Structure of hemoglobin the proteins α and β subunits are in red and blue,

Delta-beta thalassemia is autosomal recessive disorder, which means both parents are affected and two copies of the gene must be present. A carrier gets a normal gene to produce hemoglobin A, from one parent and the other parent supplies a gene which makes no hemoglobin A. Delta-beta thalassemia is considered rare.

Delta-beta-thalassemia is caused by deletions of the entire delta and beta genes sequences and only gamma-globin and HbF are formed. Rarely, non-deletional forms have been reported.

When two delta^{0} mutations are inherited, no hemoglobin A2 (alpha2, delta2) are formed. This is innocuous because only 2-3% of normal adult hemoglobin is hemoglobin A2. The individual will have normal hematological parameters (erythrocyte count, total hemoglobin, mean corpuscular volume). The delta-beta thalassemia demonstrates one mutation is at the +69 position.

== Diagnosis ==
Following the detection of hypochromic microcytic red blood cells, delta-beta thalassemia is confirmed by high-performance liquid chromatography.

=== Relation to beta thalassemia ===
Delta-beta thalassemia can mask the diagnosis of beta thalassemia trait. In beta thalassemia, an increase in hemoglobin A2 results, but the co-existence of a delta-beta thalassemia mutation will decrease the value of the hemoglobin A2 into the normal range, thereby obscuring the diagnosis of beta thalassemia trait

== Treatment ==
When needed, treatment for anemia, such as blood transfusions are used.

Stem cell transplant is another option, but the donor and the individual who will receive the bone marrow transplant must be compatible, the risks involved should be evaluated.

== See also ==
- Alpha thalassemia
- Beta-thalassemia
- Hemoglobinopathy
