= Beta thalassemia =

Hereditary blood disorder causing anemia

Beta-thalassemia
- Other names: Cooley's anemia, Mediterranean anemia
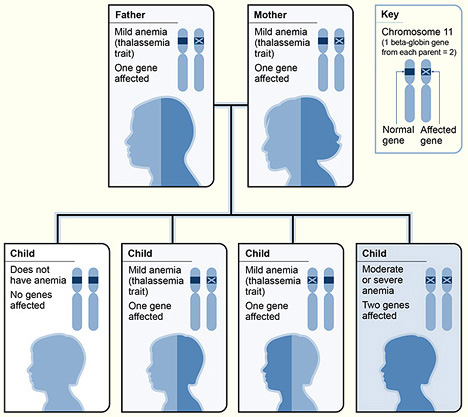
- Beta-thalassemia genetics, the picture shows one example of how beta-thalassemia is inherited. The beta-globin gene is located on chromosome 11. A child inherits two beta globin genes (one from each parent).
- Specialty: Hematology
- Symptoms: Anemia, enlarged spleen, abnormal bone structure
- Usual onset: Between 6 and 24 months of age
- Types: Beta-thalassemia minor, intermedia and major
- Causes: Mutations in the HBB gene
- Risk factors: Family history, ancestry from the Mediterranean, West Africa, the Middle East, the Indian subcontinent or Southeast Asia
- Diagnostic method: Blood smear, hemoglobin electrophoresis, iron & ferritin tests, DNA analysis
- Differential diagnosis: Alpha thalassemia, sickle cell disease, iron deficiency anemia
- Prevention: Preconception genetic counseling
- Treatment: Blood transfusion, iron chelation, stem cell transplant, gene therapy
- Frequency: 0.0005%

Beta-thalassemia (β-thalassemia) is an inherited blood disorder, a form of thalassemia resulting in variable outcomes ranging from clinically asymptomatic to severely anemic individuals. It is caused by reduced or absent synthesis of the beta chains of hemoglobin, the molecule that carries oxygen in the blood. Symptoms depend on the extent to which hemoglobin is deficient, and include anemia, pallor, tiredness, enlargement of the spleen, jaundice, and gallstones. In severe cases death ensues.

Beta thalassemia occurs due to a mutation of the HBB gene leading to deficient production of the hemoglobin subunit beta-globin; the severity of the disease depends on the nature of the mutation, and whether or not the mutation is homozygous. The body's inability to construct beta-globin leads to reduced or zero production of adult hemoglobin thus causing anemia. The other component of hemoglobin, alpha-globin, accumulates in excess leading to ineffective production of red blood cells, increased hemolysis, and iron overload. Diagnosis is by checking the medical history of near relatives, microscopic examination of blood smear, ferritin test, hemoglobin electrophoresis, and DNA sequencing.

As an inherited condition, beta thalassemia can be prevented through use of PGD in conjunction with IVF or through prenatal testing and selective abortion. In addition, genetic counselling of potential parents prior to conception can propose the use of donor sperm or eggs. If not prevented, patients may require repeated blood transfusions throughout life to maintain sufficient hemoglobin levels; this in turn may lead to severe problems associated with iron overload. Medication includes folate supplementation, iron chelation, bisphosphonates, and removal of the spleen. Beta thalassemia can also be treated by bone marrow transplant from a well matched donor, or by gene therapy.

Thalassemias were first identified in severely sick children in 1925, with identification of alpha and beta subtypes in 1965. Beta-thalassemia tends to be most common in populations originating from the Mediterranean, the Middle East, Central and Southeast Asia, the Indian subcontinent, and parts of Africa. This coincides with the historic distribution of Plasmodium falciparum malaria, and it is likely that a hereditary carrier of a gene for beta-thalassemia has some protection from severe malaria. However, because of population migration, β-thalassemia can be found around the world. In 2005, it was estimated that 1.5% of the world's population are carriers and 60,000 affected infants are born with the thalassemia major annually.

== Signs and symptoms ==
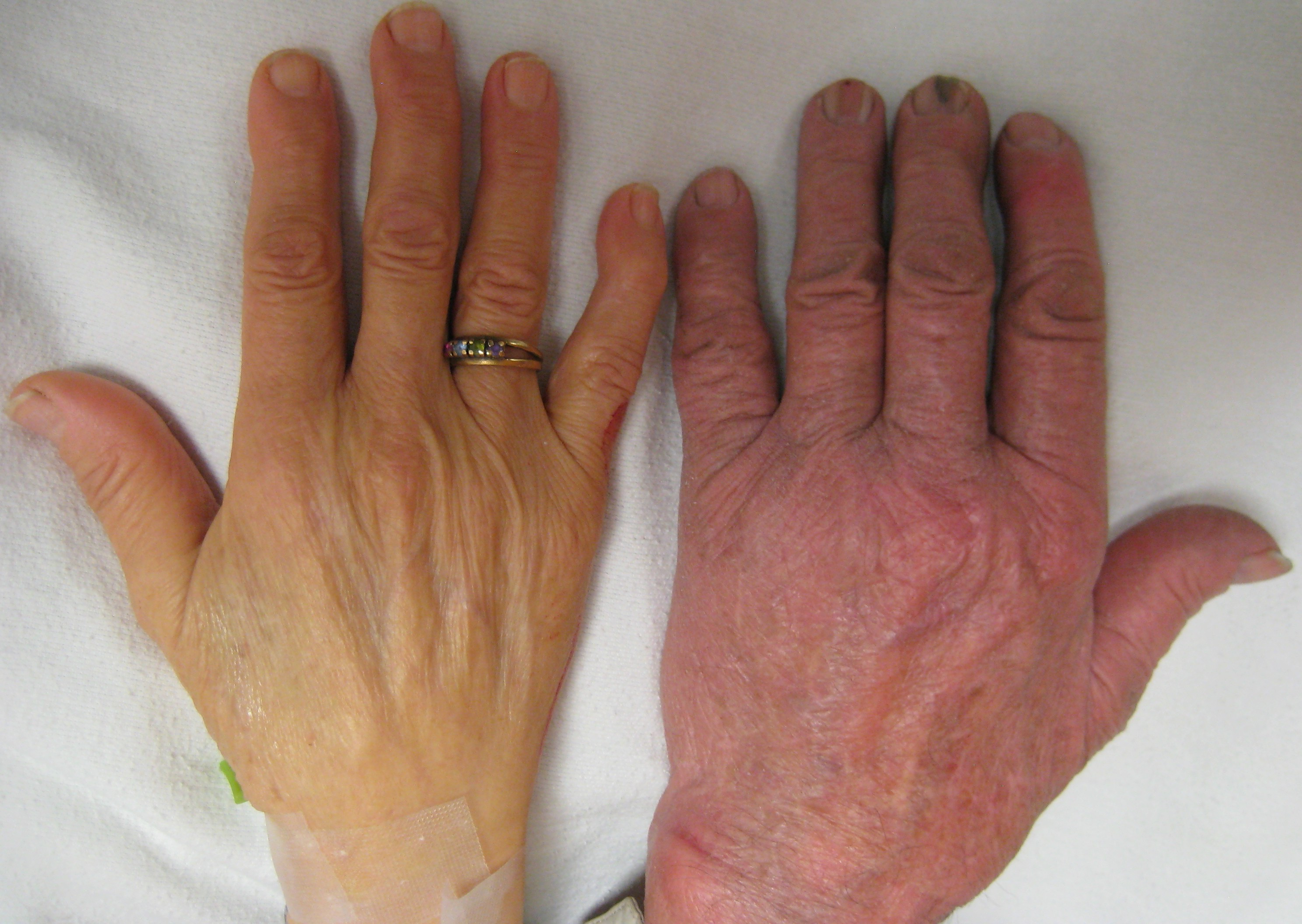
The hand of a white caucasian person with severe anemia (left, wearing ring) compared to one without

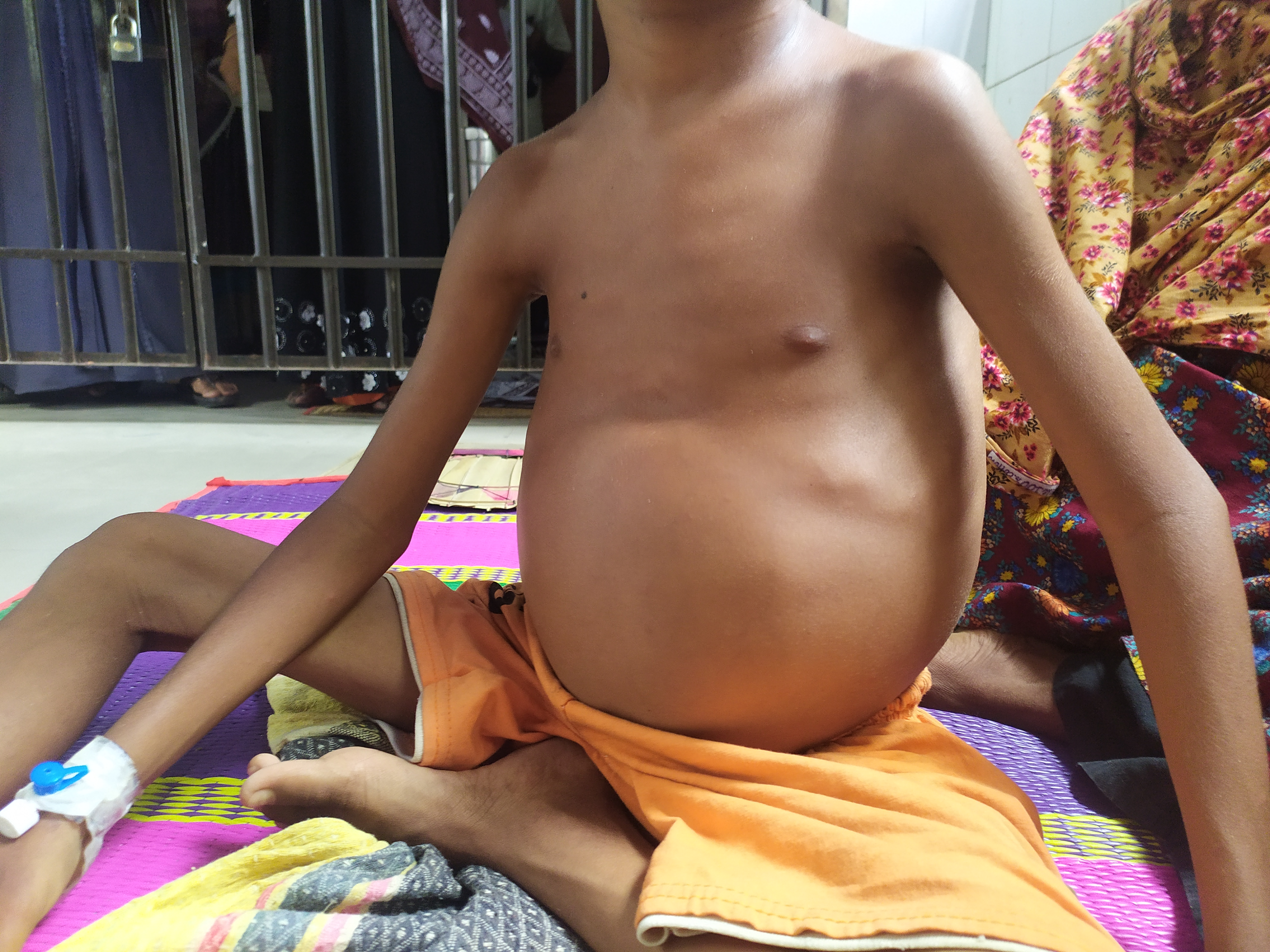
Enlarged spleen on a child with thalassemia.

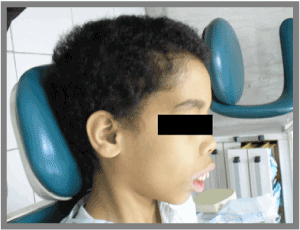
Profile of a 10 year old child affected by β thalassemia, illustrating facial abnormalities.

Symptoms depend on the type and severity of thalassemia. Carriers of thalassemia genes may have no symptoms (thalassemia minor) or very mild symptoms with occasional crisis (thalassemia intermedia); individuals who are homozygous for the mutation have severe and life threatening symptoms (thalassemia major).

Individuals with beta-thalassemia major usually present within the first two years of life with symptomatic severe anemia, poor growth, and skeletal abnormalities. Untreated thalassemia major eventually leads to death, usually by heart failure.

Those with beta-thalassemia intermedia (those who are compound heterozygotes for the beta thalassemia mutation) usually present later in life with mild to moderate symptoms of anemia.

Beta thalassemia trait (beta thalassemia minor) involves heterozygous inheritance of a beta-thalassemia mutation. Individuals usually have microcytosis with mild anemia; they are usually asymptomatic or have mild symptoms. Beta thalassemia minor can also present as beta-thalassemia silent carriers; those who inherit a beta thalassemic mutation but have no hematologic abnormalities or symptoms.

Individuals with thalassemia thalassemia major and intermedia (to a lesser extent) are susceptible to health complications that involve the spleen (hypersplenism) and gallstones (due to hyperbilirubinemia from peripheral hemolysis). Additional symptoms of beta-thalassemia major or intermedia include the classic symptoms of anemia including fatigue, developmental delay in childhood, leg ulcers, and organ failure. Ineffective erythropoiesis (red blood cell production) can lead to expansion of the bone marrow in compensation; this can then lead to deformity, bone pain, and craniofacial abnormalities. Organs such as the liver and spleen that can also become enrolled in red blood cell production, leading to hepatosplenomegaly (enlargement of the liver and spleen).

People with thalassemia can get too much iron in their bodies, either from the disease itself as RBCs are destroyed, or as a consequence of frequent blood transfusions. Excess iron is not excreted, but forms toxic non-transferrin-bound iron. This can lead to organ damage, potentially affecting the heart, liver, endocrine system, bones and spleen. Symptoms include an irregular heartbeat, cardiomyopathy, cirrhosis of the liver, hypothyroidism, delayed puberty and fertility problems, brittle and deformed bones, and an enlarged spleen.

For clinical purposes, thalassemia is categorised as either transfusion-dependent thalassemia (TDT) or non-transfusion-dependent thalassemia (NTDT) are used. Patients are usually considered as having NTDT if they have received fewer than 6 red blood cell units in the past 6 months and none in the preceding 2 months.

== Cause ==
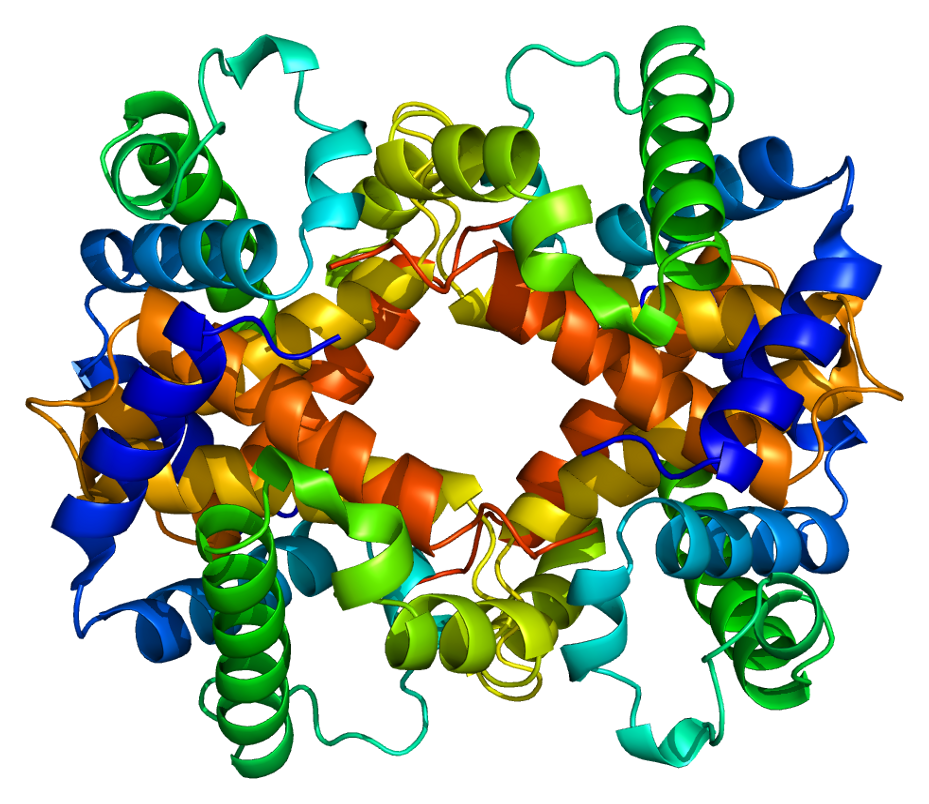
Protein HBB PDB 1a00. This is a healthy beta globin protein.

=== Hemoglobin structural biology ===
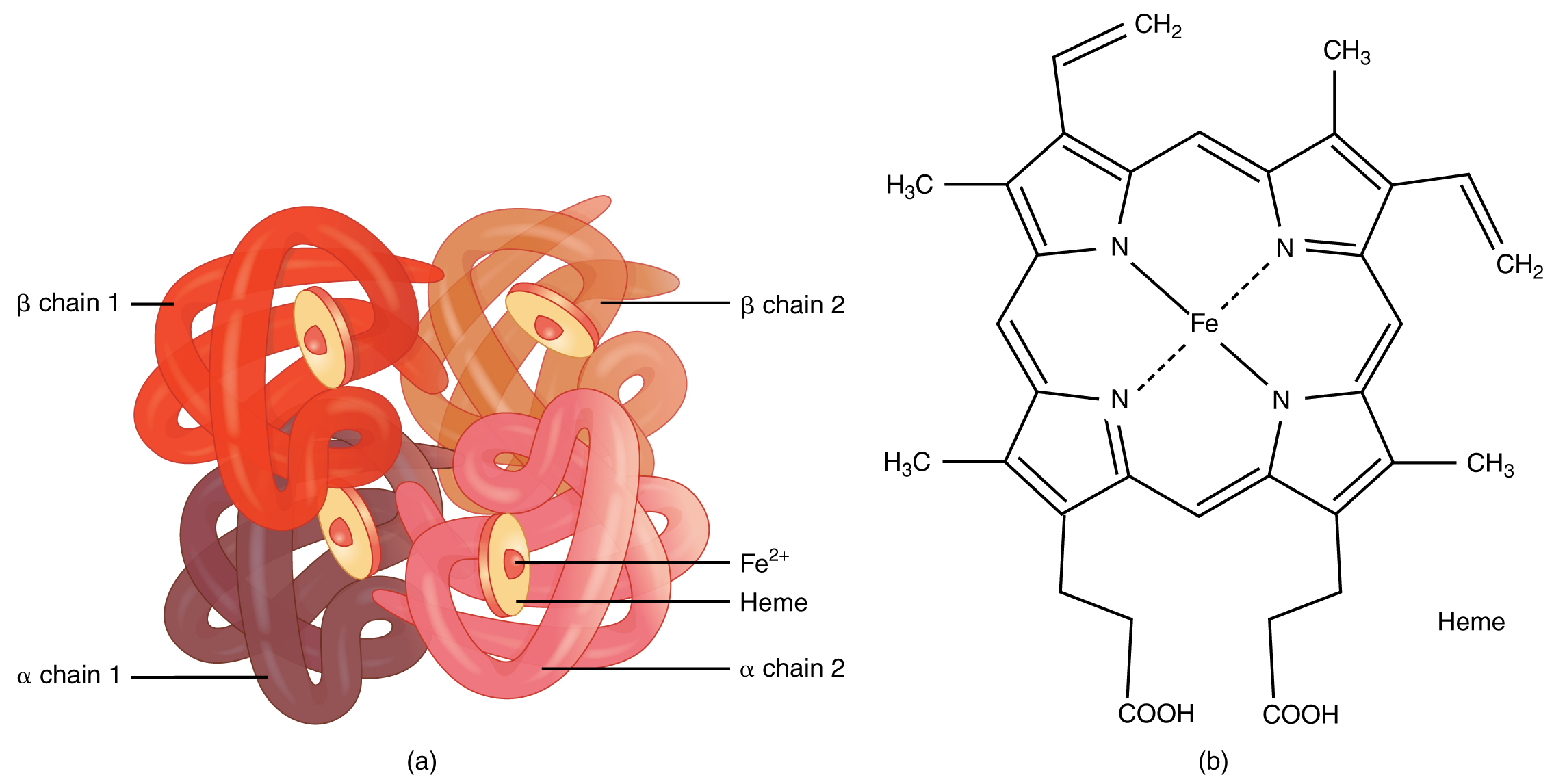
(a) schematic representation of a hemoglobin molecule, showing alpha and beta globins. (b) structure of the heme molecular component of hemoglobin

Normal human hemoglobins are tetrameric proteins composed of two pairs of globin chains, each of which contains one alpha-like (α-like) chain and one beta-like (β-like) chain. Each globin chain is associated with an iron-containing heme molecular component. Throughout life, the synthesis of the alpha-like and the beta-like chains is balanced so that their ratio is relatively constant and there is no excess of either type.

The specific alpha and beta-like chains that are incorporated into hemoglobins are highly regulated during development:

- Embryonic hemoglobins are expressed as early as four to six weeks of embryogenesis and disappear around the eighth week of gestation as they are replaced by fetal hemoglobin.
- Fetal hemoglobin (HbF) is produced from approximately eight weeks of gestation through to birth and constitutes approximately 80 percent of hemoglobin in the full-term neonate. It declines during the first few months of life and constitutes <1 percent of total hemoglobin by and past early childhood. HbF is composed of two alpha globins and two gamma globins (α2γ2).
- Adult hemoglobin (HbA) is produced at low levels through embryonic and fetal life and is the predominant hemoglobin in children by six months of age and onward; it constitutes 96-97% of total hemoglobin in individuals without a hemoglobinopathy. It is composed of two alpha globins and two beta globins (α2β2).
- Hemoglobin A2 (HbA2) is a minor adult hemoglobin that normally accounts for approximately 2.5-3.5% of total hemoglobin. It is composed of two alpha globins and two delta globins (α2δ2).

=== Mutations ===
β-globin chains are encoded by the HBB gene on chromosome 11; in a healthy person with two copies on each chromosome, two loci encode the β chain. In beta thalassemia, a single faulty gene can be either asymptomatic or cause mild disease; if both genes are faulty this causes moderate to severe disease.

More than 350 mutations have been identified which can cause beta thalassemia; 20 of these account for 80% of beta-thalassemia cases.

Two major groups of mutations can be distinguished:

- Nondeletion forms: These defects, in general, involve a single base-pair substitution or small insertions near or upstream of the HBB gene.
- Deletion forms: base-pair deletions of different sizes involving the HBB gene produce syndromes such as hereditary persistence of fetal hemoglobin syndrome.

Mutations are characterized as (β^{o}) if they prevent any formation of β globin chains, and mutations are characterized as (β^{+}) if they allow some β globin chain formation to occur.

Name	Older synonyms	Description	Alleles
Thalassemia minor		Heterozygous form: Only one of the β globin alleles bears a mutation. Affected individuals will develop microcytic anemia. Detection usually involves a lower than normal mean corpuscular volume value (<80 fL).	β^{+}/β β^{o}/β
Thalassemia intermedia		Affected individuals can often manage a normal life but may need occasional transfusions, e.g., at times of illness or pregnancy, depending on the severity of their anemia.	β^{+}/β^{+} β^{o}/β^{+}
Thalassemia major	Mediterranean anemia; Cooley anemia	Homozygous form: Occurs when both alleles have thalassemia mutations. Untreated, it causes severe anemia, splenomegaly and bone deformities, and progresses to death before age 20. Treatment consists of periodic blood transfusion; splenectomy for splenomegaly and chelation of transfusion-related iron overload.	β^{o}/β^{o}

Due to globin defects, beta thalassemia patients do not have normal levels of adult hemoglobin (HbA), and instead have elevated levels of HbA2 (α_{2}δ_{2}). Production of this form of hemoglobin may increase as a consequence of stress erythropoiesis.

== Diagnosis ==
=== Prenatal and newborn screening ===
Checking for hemoglobinopathies begins during pregnancy, with a prenatal screening questionnaire which includes, among other things, a consideration of health issues in the child's parents and close relatives. During pregnancy, genetic testing can be done on samples taken of fetal blood, of amniotic fluid, or chorionic villus sampling. A routine heel prick test, in which a small sample of blood is collected a few days after birth, can detect some forms of hemoglobinopathy.

=== Diagnostic tests ===
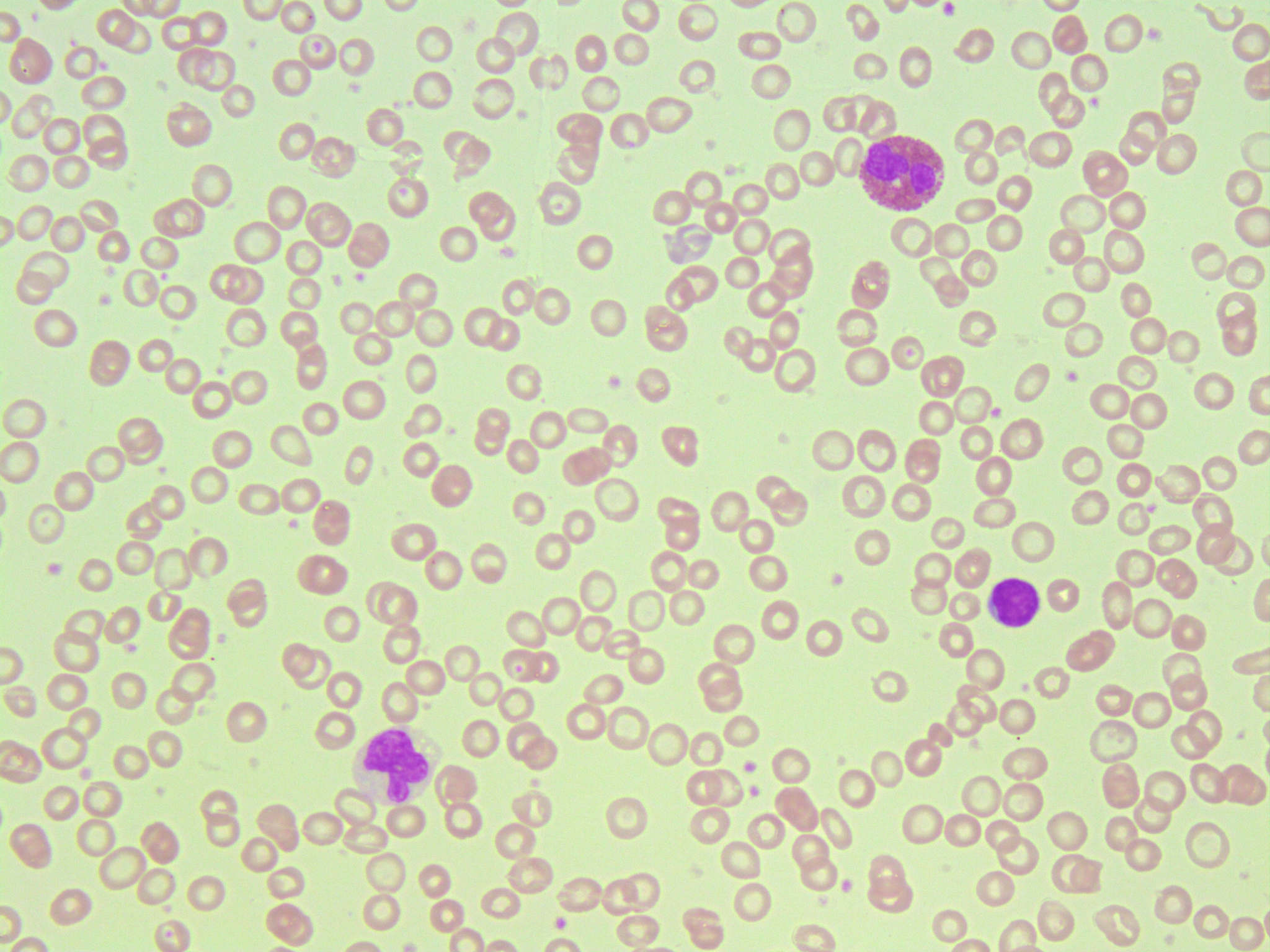
An image from a peripheral blood smear demonstrating microcytic, hypochromic red blood cells in thalassemia (50X oil immersion). An eosinophil, small lymphocyte, platelets and monocyte are also present.

The initial tests for thalassemias are:

- Complete blood count (CBC): Checks the number, size, and maturity of blood cells. Hemoglobin of less than 10 g/dl may indicate a carrier, below 7 g/dl is indicative of thalassemia major. In thalassemia major, mean corpuscular volume (MCV) are less than 70 fl, in thalassemia intermedia, MCV levels are below 80 fl (The normal range for MCV is 80–100 fl). The Mentzer index can be a pointer for diagnosis of thalassemia; it can be calculated from a CBC report.
- Peripheral blood smear: A blood smear examined under a microscope can show red blood cells that are abnormal in shape (poikilocytosis or codocytes), color (hypochromic), or size (microcytic), as well as those with abnormal inclusions (Heinz bodies).
- Serum iron and ferritin: these tests are needed to rule out iron-deficiency anemia.

For an exact diagnosis, the following tests can be performed:

- Hemoglobin electrophoresis is a test that can detect different types of hemoglobin. Hemoglobin is extracted from the red cells, then introduced into a porous gel and subjected to an electrical field. This separates the normal and abnormal types of hemoglobin which can then be identified and quantified. Due to reduced production of HbA in beta thalassemia, the proportion of HbA2 and HbF relative to HbA are generally increased above normal. In alpha thalassemia the normal proportion is maintained.
- High-performance liquid chromatography (HPLC) is reliable, fully automated, and able to distinguish most types of abnormal hemoglobin including carriers, The method separates and quantifies hemoglobin fractions by measuring their rate of flow through a column of absorbent material.
- DNA analysis using polymerase chain reaction (PCR) or next-generation sequencing. These tests can identify carriers of thalassemia genes and combination hemoglobinopathies, as well as identifying the exact mutation which underlies the disease.

== Prevention ==
=== Risk factors ===
Family history and ancestry are factors that increase the risk of beta-thalassemia. Depending on family history, if a person's parents or grandparents had beta thalassemia major or intermedia, there is a 75% (3 out of 4) probability (see inheritance chart at top of page) of the mutated gene being inherited by an offspring. Even if a child does not have symptomatic beta thalassemia they can still be a carrier, leading to an increased risk in future generations of their offspring having beta-thalassemia.

Beta thalassemia occurs most often in people of Mediterranean, Middle Eastern, Southern Asian, and African ancestry.

=== Counselling and screening ===
The American College of Obstetricians and Gynecologists recommends all people thinking of becoming pregnant should be offered testing to see if they have thalassemia trait. Genetic counseling and genetic testing are recommended for families who carry a thalassemia trait. Understanding the genetic risk, ideally before a family is started, would hopefully allow families to understand more about the condition and make an informed decision that is best for their family.

A number of countries have programs aimed at reducing the incidence of beta-thalassemia:-

- Cyprus has one of the highest carrier rates in the world. A program of premarital screening and counselling has, since the program's implementation in the 1970s, reduced the number of children born with thalassemia major from one of every 158 births to almost zero. Greece also has a screening program to identify people who are carriers.
- In Iran as a premarital screening, the man's red cell indices are checked first. If he has microcytosis (mean cell hemoglobin < 27 pg or mean red cell volume < 80 fl), the woman is tested. When both are microcytic, their hemoglobin A2 concentrations are measured. If both have a concentration above 3.5% (diagnostic of thalassemia trait) they are referred to the local designated health post for genetic counseling.
- Large-scale awareness campaigns are being organized in India both by government and non-government organizations to promote voluntary premarital screening, with marriage between carriers strongly discouraged.

== Treatment ==
Treatment for thalassemia depends on the severity of the disease. People with thalassemia traits (thalassemia minor or non transfusion dependent thalassemia), may not require medical or follow-up care after the initial diagnosis is made. Occasionally transfusions may be necessary particularly around childbirth, surgery, or if other conditions provoke anemia. A folic acid supplement may also be recommended.

For those with severe forms of thalassemia (thalassemia major, or transfusion-dependent thalassemia), the three principal treatments are red blood cell transfusions to relieve anemia, iron chelation to mitigate the side effects of transfusion, and folic acid supplementation to encourage the growth of new blood cells. Other forms of treatment available depending on individual circumstances.

=== Red blood cell transfusions ===
Blood transfusions are the main treatment approach for prolonging life. Donated healthy red blood cells have a functional life of 4 to 6 weeks before they wear out and are broken down in the spleen. Regular transfusions every three to four weeks are necessary in order to maintain hemoglobin at a healthy level. Transfusions come with risks including iron overload, the risk of acquiring infections, and the risk of immune reaction to the donated cells (alloimmunization).

=== Iron chelation ===
Multiple blood transfusions lead to severe iron overload, as the body eventually breaks down the hemoglobin in donated cells. This releases iron which it is unable to excrete. Iron overload may be treated by chelation therapy with the medications deferoxamine, deferiprone, or deferasirox. Deferoxamine is only effective as a daily injection, complicating its long-term use. Adverse effects include primary skin reactions around the injection site and hearing loss. Deferasirox and deferiprone are both oral medications, whose common side effects include nausea, vomiting and diarrhea.

=== Folic acid ===
Folate is a B group vitamin which is involved in the manufacture of red blood cells. Folate supplementation, in the form of folic acid, is often recommended in thalassemia.

=== Other treatments ===
==== Luspatercept ====
Luspatercept is a drug used to treat anemia in adults with β-thalassemia, it can improve the maturation of red blood cells and reduce the need for frequent blood transfusions. It is administered by injection every three weeks. Luspatercept was authorised for use in the US in 2019 and by the European Medicines Agency in 2020.

==== Hydroxyurea ====
Hydroxyurea is another drug that can sometimes be administered to relieve anemia caused by beta-thalassemia. This is achieved, in part, by reactivating fetal haemoglobin production; however its effectiveness is uncertain.

==== Osteoporosis ====
People with thalassemia are at a higher risk of osteoporosis. Treatment options include bisphosphonates and zinc supplementation.

==== Removal of the spleen ====
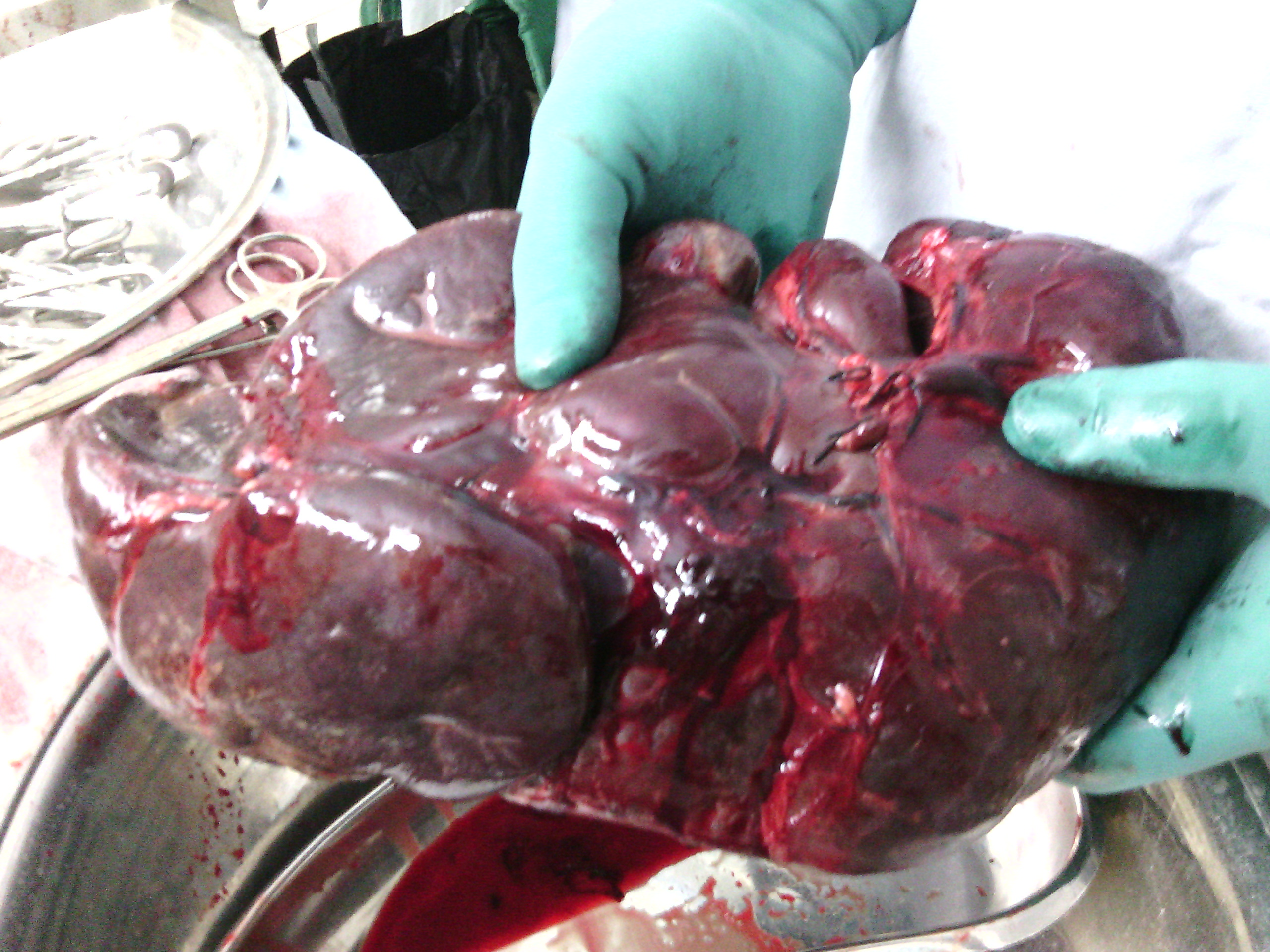
Surgically removed spleen of a thalassemic child. It is about 15 times larger than normal.

The spleen is the organ which removes damaged or misshapen red blood cells from the circulation. In thalassemia, this can lead to the spleen becoming enlarged, a condition known as splenomegaly. Slight enlargement of the spleen is not a problem, however if it becomes extreme then surgical removal of the spleen (splenectomy) may be recommended.

== Transplantation and gene therapy ==
Hematopoietic stem cells (HSC) are cells in the bone marrow that can develop into all types of blood cells, including red blood cells, white blood cells, and platelets. There are two possible ways to treat hemoglobinopathies by targeting HSCs. One is to transplant HSCs from a healthy donor into the patient's bone marrow; this was pioneered in 1981. More recently, it has become possible to use CRISPR gene editing technology to modify the patient's own HSCs in a way that increases production of functional beta-globin chains, leading to near normal levels of healthy hemoglobin.

All stem cell treatments must involve myeloablation of the patients' bone marrow in order to remove HSCs containing the faulty gene. This requires high doses of chemotherapy agents with side effects such as sickness and tiredness. A long hospital stay is necessary after infusion of the replacement HSCs while the cells take up residence in the bone marrow and start to make red blood cells with the stable form of haemoglobin.

=== Hematopoietic stem cell transplantation ===
Hematopoietic stem cell transplantation (HSCT) is a potentially curative treatment for both alpha and beta thalassemia. It involves replacing the dysfunctional stem cells in the bone marrow with healthy cells from a well-matched donor. Cells are ideally sourced from human leukocyte antigen matched relatives; the procedure is more likely to succeed in children rather than adults.

The first HSC transplant for thalassemia was carried out in 1981 on a patient with beta thalassemia major. Since then, a number of patients have received bone marrow transplants from healthy matched donors, although this procedure has a high level of risk.

In 2018 an unborn child with hydrops fetalis, a potentially fatal complication of alpha thalassemia, was successfully transfused in utero with her mother's stem cells.

HSCT is a dangerous procedure with many possible complications; it is reserved for patients with life-threatening diseases. Risks associated with HSCT can include graft-versus host disease, failure of the graft, and other toxicity related to the transplant. In one study of 31 people, the procedure was successful for 22 whose hemoglobin levels improved to the normal range, in seven the graft failed and they continued to live with thalassemia, and two died of transplantation-related causes.

=== Gene therapy ===
Gene therapy for hemoglobinopathies was first trialled in 2014 on a single patient with sickle cell disease (a fault in the beta globin gene), and followed by clinical trials in which a number of patients with either sickle cell or beta thalassemia were successfully treated.

Gene therapies work by first harvesting the patient's HSCs, then using CRISPR gene editing to modify their DNA in the laboratory. In parallel with this, the person with thalassemia disease undergoes a myeloablation procedure (a form of chemotherapy) to destroy the remaining HSCs in their bone marrow. The laboratory treated cells are then infused back into the patient where they colonise the bone marrow and eventually commence production of healthy blood cells. There are fewer risks from this procedure than from HSCT, since the transplanted cells are autologous having originated from the patient herself/himself.

There are two approved forms of gene therapy for beta thalassemia.

Betibeglogene autotemcel, sold under the brand name Zynteglo, is a gene therapy for the treatment for beta thalassemia which adds a healthy beta-globin gene to the HSCs. It was approved for medical use in the United States in August 2022. The procedure involves collecting hematopoietic stem cells (HSCs) from the affected person's blood. In the laboratory, these HSCs then have a new gene for T87Q-globin (a modified beta-globin) introduced to them using a lentiviral vector. Meanwhile the affected person undergoes myeloablative conditioning, after which the altered HSCs can be infused back, becoming engrafted in the bone marrow where they proliferate. This results in a progressive increase in beta-globin synthesis which improves the balance of alpha and beta globins in all subsequent developing red blood cells. Healthy hemoglobin A is generated resolving the anemia.

Exagamglogene autotemcel, sold under the brand name Casgevy, is a gene therapy for the treatment of transfusion-dependent beta thalassemia which induces increased production of fetal hemoglobin HbF. The treatment was approved in the United Kingdom for the treatment of transfusion-dependent beta thalassemia in November 2023 and in the United States in January 2024. Casgevy works by editing the BCL11A gene, which normally inhibits the production of HbF in adults. The edit has the effect of increasing production of gamma globin, a component of fetal hemoglobin HbF, and thereby resolving the anemia.

== Combination hemoglobinopathies ==
A combination hemoglobinopathy occurs when someone inherits two different abnormal hemoglobin genes. If these are different versions of the same gene, one having been inherited from each parent it is an example of compound heterozygosity.

Some examples of clinically significant combinations involving beta thalassemia include:

- Hemoglobin C/ beta thalassemia: common in Mediterranean and African populations generally results in a moderate form of anemia with splenomegaly.
- Hemoglobin D/ beta thalassemia: common in the northwestern parts of India and Pakistan (Punjab region).
- Hemoglobin E/ beta thalassemia: common in Cambodia, Thailand, and parts of India, it is clinically similar to β thalassemia major or β thalassemia intermedia.
- Hemoglobin S/ beta thalassemia: common in African and Mediterranean populations, it is clinically similar to sickle-cell anemia.
- Delta-beta thalassemia is a rare form of thalassemia in which there is a reduced production of both the delta and beta globins. It is generally asymptomatic.

== Epidemiology ==
Beta thalassemia is particularly prevalent among the Mediterranean peoples and this geographical association is responsible for its naming: thalassa (θάλασσα) is the Greek word for sea and haima (αἷμα) is the Greek word for blood. In Europe, the highest prevalence of beta-thalassemia trait is found in Greece, Turkey, and Mediterranean islands such as Sicily, Sardinia, Corsica, Cyprus, Malta and Crete.

=== Incidence ===
Beta thalassemia is most prevalent in the "thalassemia belt" which includes areas in Sub-Saharan Africa, and the Mediterranean extending into the Middle East and Southeast Asia. This geographical distribution is thought to be due to the beta-thalassemia carrier state (beta-thalassemia minor) conferring resistance to malaria. In 2005, it was estimated that 1.5% of the world's population are carriers and 60,000 affected infants are born with the thalassemia major annually.

=== Evolutionary adaptation ===
The thalassemia trait may confer a degree of protection against malaria, which is historically endemic in the regions where the trait is common. This is thought to confer a selective survival advantage on carriers (known as heterozygous advantage), thus perpetuating the mutation. In that respect, the various thalassemias resemble other genetic disorders affecting hemoglobin, such as sickle-cell disease or Hemoglobin C disease.

== See also ==
- Alpha-thalassemia
- Anisopoikilocytosis
- Delta-thalassemia
- Hemoglobinopathy
