= Thalassemia =

Family of inherited blood disorders

- Other names: Thalassaemia, Mediterranean anemia
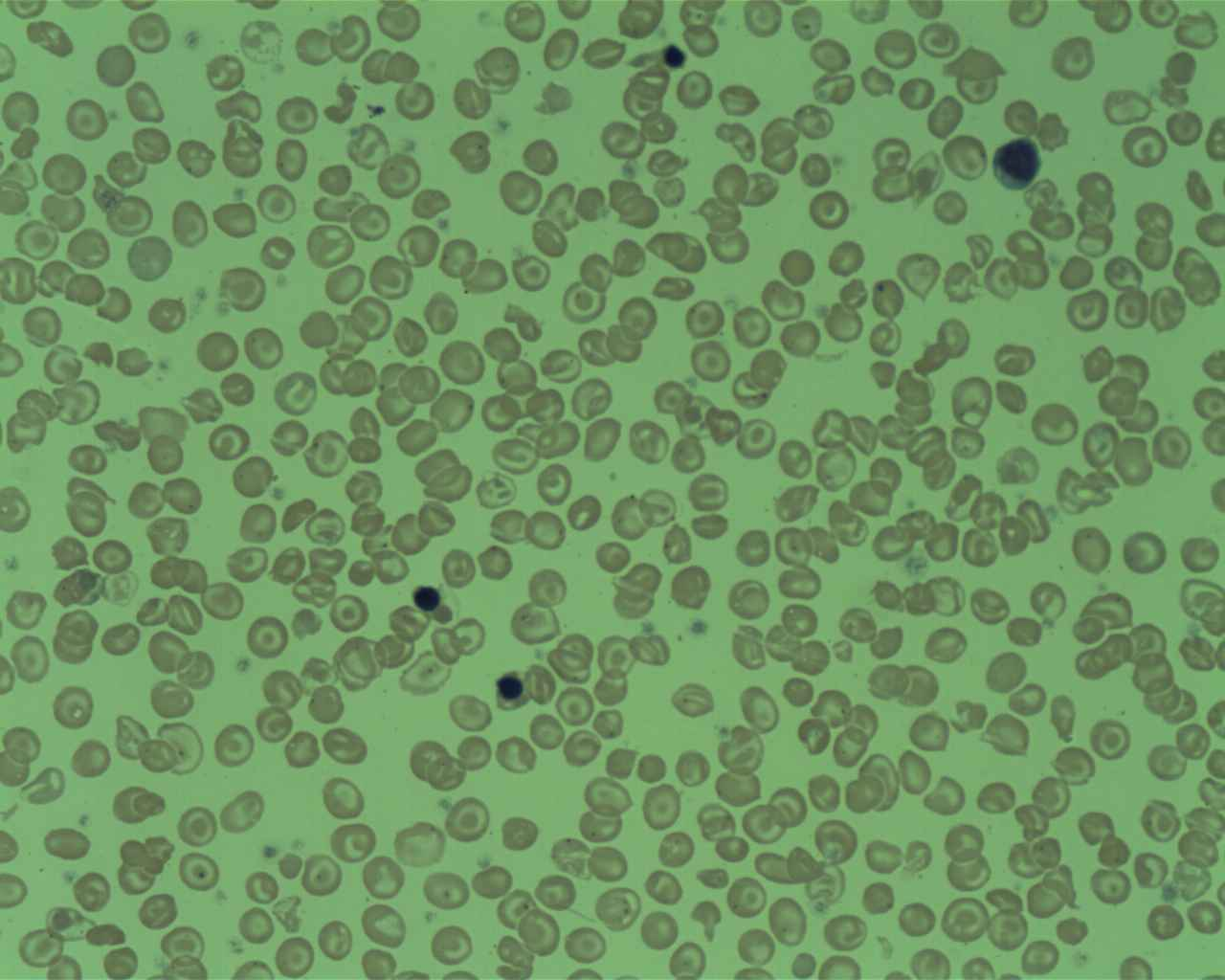
- Peripheral blood film from a person with delta-beta thalassemia
- Pronunciation: /θælɪˈsiːmiə/
- Specialty: Hematology, medical genetics
- Symptoms: Feeling tired, pale skin, enlarged spleen, yellowish skin, dark urine
- Causes: Genetic (autosomal recessive)
- Diagnostic method: Blood tests, genetic tests
- Treatment: Blood transfusions, iron chelation, folic acid
- Frequency: 280 million (2015)
- Deaths: 16,800 (2015)

Thalassemias are a group of inherited blood disorders that manifest as the production of reduced hemoglobin. Symptoms depend on the type of thalassemia and can vary from none to severe, including death. Often there is mild-to-severe anemia (low red blood cells or hemoglobin), as thalassemia can affect the production of red blood cells and also affect how long the red blood cells live. Symptoms include tiredness, pallor, bone problems, an enlarged spleen, jaundice, pulmonary hypertension, and dark urine. A child's growth and development may be slower than normal.

Thalassemias are genetic disorders. Alpha thalassemia is caused by deficient production of the alpha globin component of hemoglobin, while beta thalassemia is a deficiency in the beta globin component. The severity of alpha and beta thalassemia depends on how many of the four genes for alpha globin or two genes for beta globin are faulty. Diagnosis is typically by blood tests including a complete blood count, special hemoglobin tests, and genetic tests. Diagnosis may occur before birth through prenatal testing.

Treatment depends on the type and severity. Clinically, thalassemia is classed as Transfusion-Dependent Thalassemia (TDT) or non-Transfusion-Dependent Thalassemia (NTDT), since this determines the principal treatment options. TDT requires regular blood transfusions, typically every two to five weeks. TDTs include beta-thalassemia major, hemoglobin H disease, and severe HbE/beta-thalassemia. NTDT does not need regular transfusions but may require transfusion in case of an anemia crisis. Complications of transfusion include iron overload with resulting heart or liver disease. Other symptoms of thalassemias include enlargement of the spleen, frequent infections, and osteoporosis.

The 2021 Global Burden of Disease Survey found that 1.31 million people worldwide have severe thalassemia while thalassemia trait occurs in 358 million people, causing 11,100 deaths per annum. It is slightly more prevalent in males than females. It is most common among people of Greek, Italian, Middle Eastern, South Asian, and African descent. Those who have minor degrees of thalassemia, in common with those who have sickle-cell trait, have some protection against malaria, explaining why sickle-cell trait and thalassemia are historically more common in regions of the world where the risk of malaria is higher.

== Etymology and synonym ==
The word thalassemia (/θælɪˈsiːmiə/) derives from the Greek thalassa (θάλασσα), 'sea', and Neo-Latin -emia (from the Greek compound stem -aimia [-αιμία], from haima [αἷμα], 'blood'). It was coined because the condition called "Mediterranean anemia" was first described in people of Mediterranean ethnicities. "Mediterranean anemia" was renamed thalassemia major once the genetics were better understood. The word thalassemia was first used in 1932.

== Hemoglobin structural biology ==
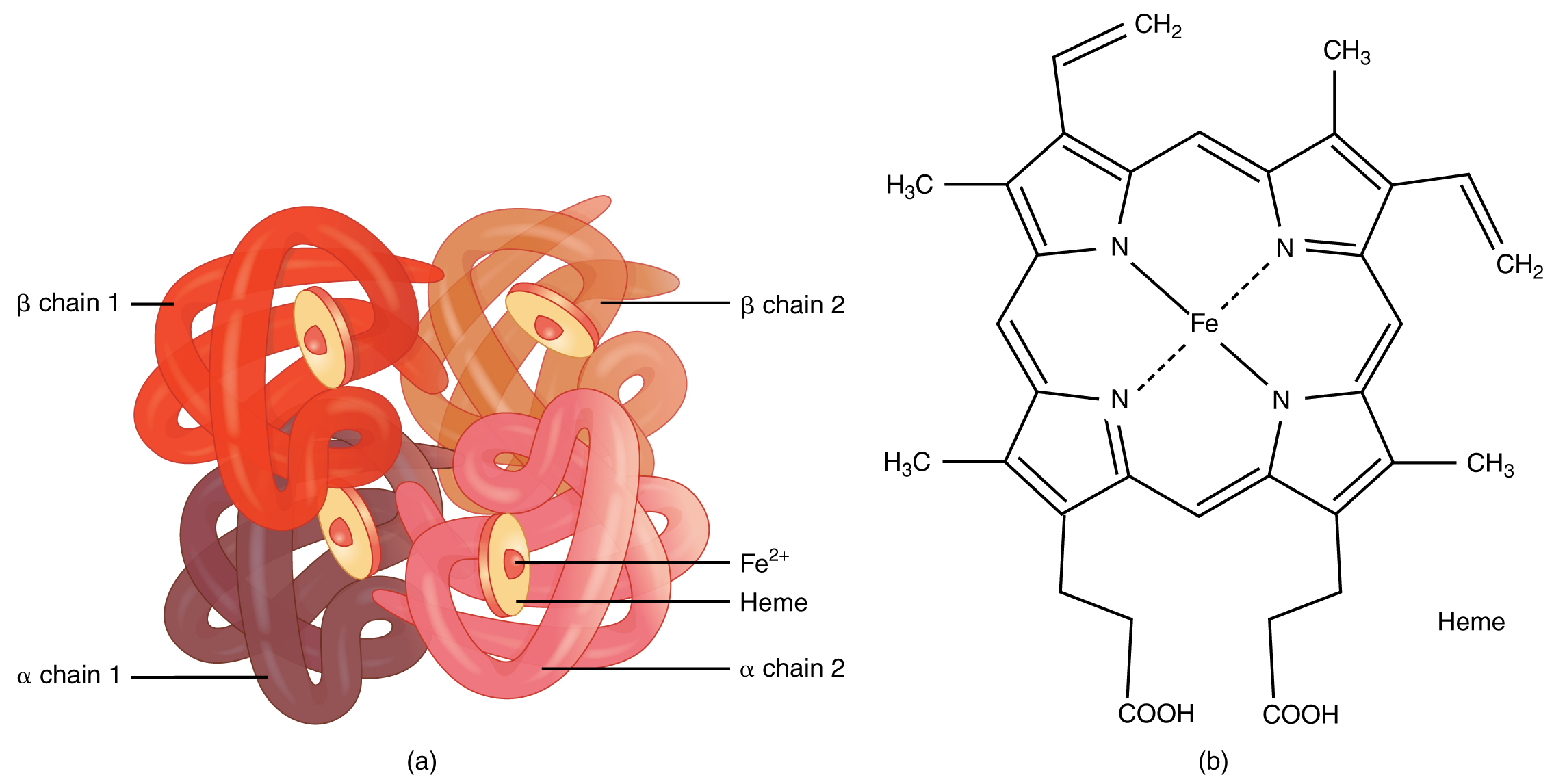
(a) schematic representation of a hemoglobin molecule, showing alpha and beta globins. (b) structure of the heme molecular component of hemoglobin

Normal human hemoglobins are tetrameric proteins composed of two pairs of globin chains, each of which contains one alpha-like (α-like) chain and one beta-like (β-like) chain. Each globin chain is associated with an iron-containing heme molecular component. Throughout life, the synthesis of the alpha-like and the beta-like chains is balanced so that their ratio is relatively constant and there is no excess of either type.

The specific alpha and beta-like chains that are incorporated into hemoglobins are highly regulated during development:

- Embryonic hemoglobins are expressed as early as four to six weeks of embryogenesis and disappear around the eighth week of gestation as they are replaced by fetal hemoglobin.
- Fetal hemoglobin (HbF) is produced from approximately eight weeks of gestation through to birth and constitutes approximately 80 percent of hemoglobin in the full-term neonate. It declines during the first few months of life and constitutes <1 percent of total hemoglobin by and past early childhood. HbF is composed of two alpha globins and two gamma globins (α2γ2).
- Adult hemoglobin (HbA) is produced at low levels through embryonic and fetal life and is the predominant hemoglobin in children by six months of age and onward; it constitutes 96-97% of total hemoglobin in individuals without a hemoglobinopathy. It is composed of two alpha globins and two beta globins (α2β2).
- Hemoglobin A2 (HbA2) is a minor adult hemoglobin that normally accounts for approximately 2.5-3.5% of total hemoglobin. It is composed of two alpha globins and two delta globins (α2δ2).

== Symptoms ==
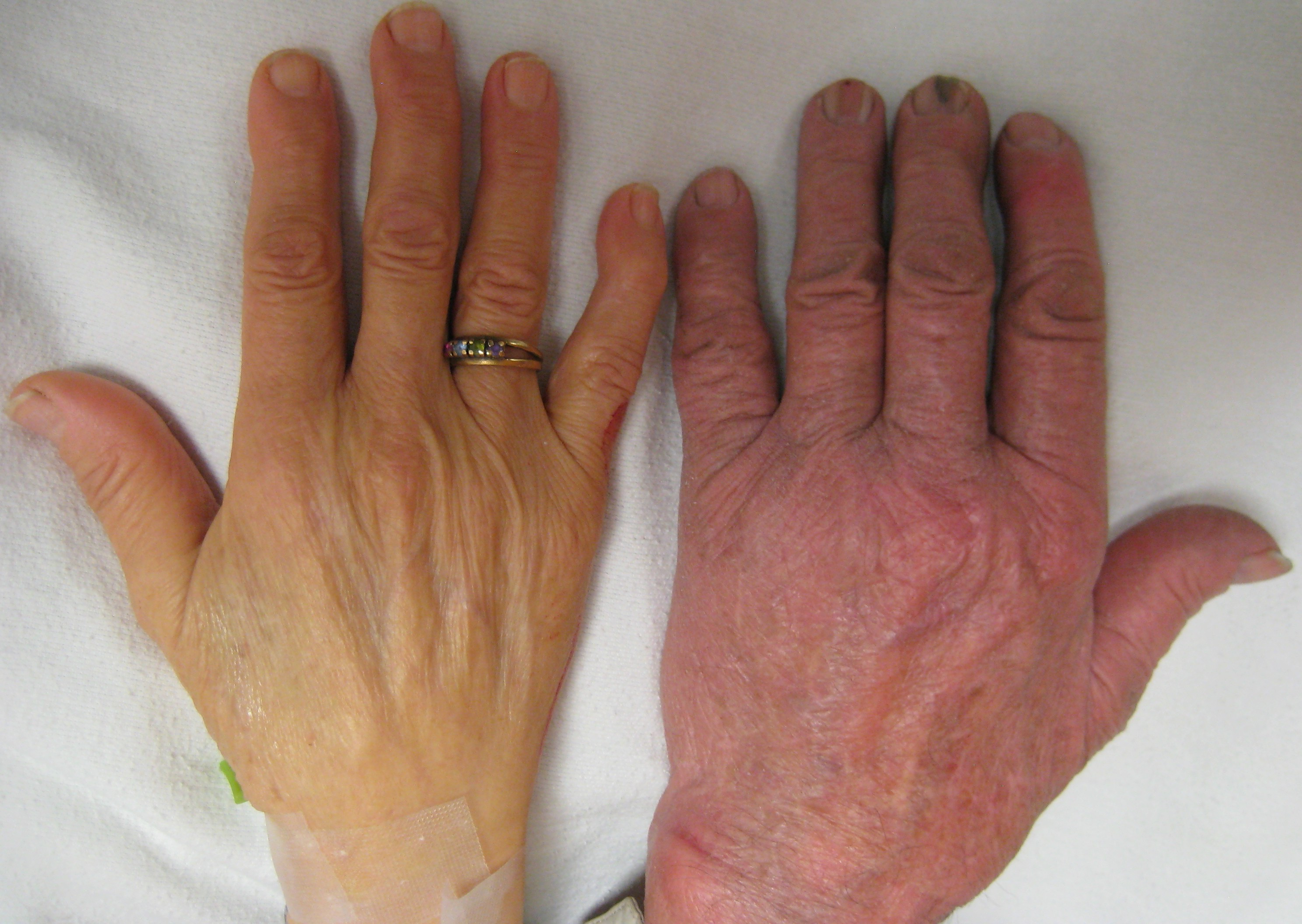
Hand of a white caucasian person with severe anemia (left) compared with a person without anemia (right)

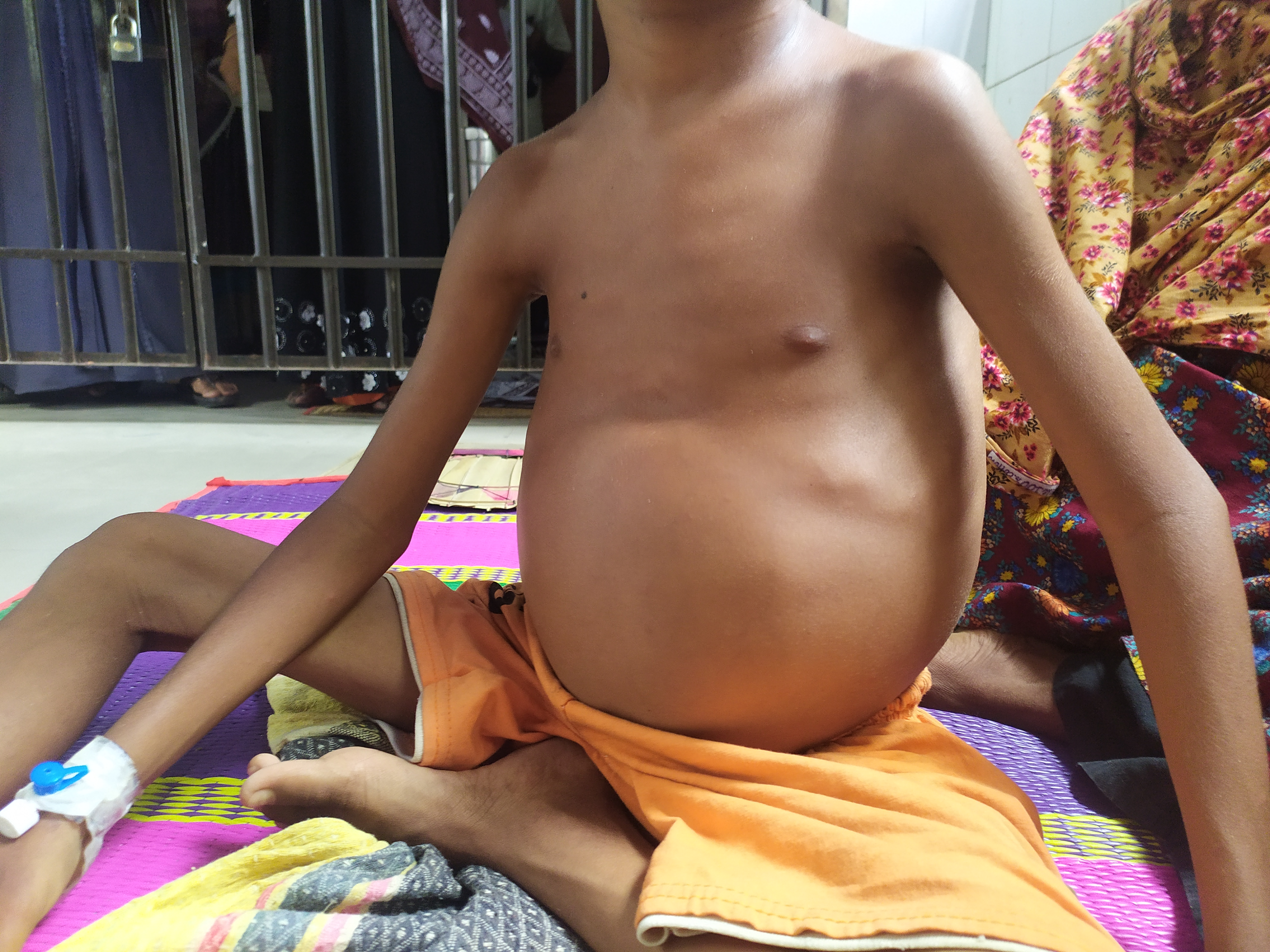
Enlarged spleen on a child with thalassemia.

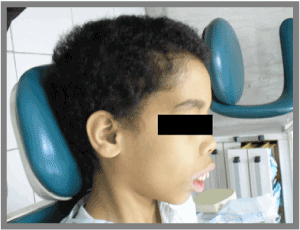
Profile of a 10 year old child affected by β thalassemia, illustrating facial abnormalities.

Symptoms depend on the type and severity of thalassemia. Carriers of thalassemia genes may have no symptoms (thalassemia minor) or very mild symptoms with occasional crisis (thalassemia intermedia); individuals who are homozygous for the mutation have severe and life threatening symptoms (thalassemia major).

Alpha thalassemia major is generally fatal to the unborn child, as the absence of alpha globin means that zero functional hemoglobin is produced during gestation. Unmatched gamma globin chains cluster to form hemoglobin Barts, which is ineffective at transporting oxygen. In this situation, a fetus will develop hydrops fetalis, a form of edema, which can be detected on prenatal ultrasound. The child will normally die before or shortly after birth, unless intrauterine blood transfusion is performed. Less severe alpha thalassemia may affect growth and development.

Beta thalassemia symptoms typically begin to show during the first six months of life, as the body winds down production of fetal hemoglobin HbF. In a normal individual, this would be replaced by adult hemoglobin HbA.

If thalassemia is untreated or undetected in the infant, this can lead to developmental issues such as slowed growth, delayed puberty, bone abnormalities, and intellectual impairment.

More generally, impaired production of hemoglobin causes anemia, resulting in tiredness and a general lack of energy, shortness of breath, rapid or irregular heartbeat, dizziness, pale skin, yellowing of the skin and eyes (jaundice).

In thalassemia, ineffective erythropoiesis causes the bone marrow to expand. This expansion is a compensatory response to the damage caused to red blood cells by the imbalanced production of globin chains. Bone marrow expansion can lead to abnormal bone structure, particularly in the skull and face. Expansion of the bone marrow in the developing child leads to a distinctive facial shape often referred to as "Chipmunk facies". Other skeletal changes include osteoporosis, growth retardation, and malformation of the spine.

People with thalassemia can get too much iron in their bodies, either from the disease itself as red blood cells are destroyed, or as a consequence of frequent blood transfusions. Excess iron is not excreted, but forms toxic non-transferrin-bound iron. This can lead to organ damage, potentially affecting the heart, liver, endocrine system, bones and spleen. Symptoms include an irregular heartbeat, cardiomyopathy, cirrhosis of the liver, hypothyroidism, delayed puberty and fertility problems, brittle and deformed bones, and an enlarged spleen.

The spleen is the organ which removes damaged red blood cells from circulation; in thalassemia patients it is abnormally active, causing it to enlarge and possibly become hyperactive, a condition called hypersplenism.

The immune system can become compromised in a number of ways; anemia, iron overload, and hypersplenism may affect the immune response and increase the risk of severe infection.

== Pathophysiology ==
Hemoglobin is a protein containing iron that facilitates the transportation of oxygen in red blood cells. Hemoglobin in the blood carries oxygen from the lungs to the other tissues of the body, where it releases the oxygen to enable metabolism. A healthy level of hemoglobin for men is between 13.2 and 16.6 grams per deciliter, and in women between 11.6 and 15 g/dl.

Normal adult hemoglobin (HbA) is composed of four protein chains, two α and two β-globin chains arranged into a heterotetramer. In thalassemia, patients have defects in the noncoding region of either the α or β-globin genes, causing ineffective production of normal alpha- or beta-globin chains, which can lead to ineffective erythropoiesis, premature red blood cell destruction, and anemia. The thalassemias are classified according to which chain of the hemoglobin molecule is affected. In α-thalassemias, production of the α-globin chain is affected, while in β-thalassemia, production of the β-globin chain is affected.

=== Evolutionary advantage ===
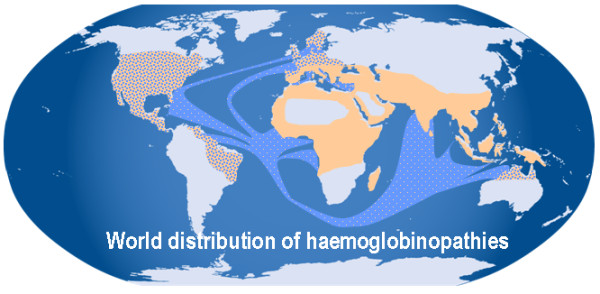
The world distribution of haemoglobinopathies overlaps the geographic distribution of malaria. The prevalence has increased in previously non-endemic areas as a consequence of historical and recent immigration flows, slave-trade, trading activities and colonization. In all these regions there is a high prevalence of a thalassaemia. It is believed that carriers of α thalassaemia are protected against malaria and that natural selection is responsible for elevating and maintaining their gene frequencies.

Having a mild form of alpha thalassemia has been demonstrated to protect against malaria and thus can be an advantage in malaria endemic areas, thus conferring a selective survival advantage on carriers (known as heterozygous advantage), and perpetuating the mutation. There are suggestions that mild beta thalassemia may provide similar protection but this has not been proven.

α-thalassemia genes have a high prevalence in populations of sub-Saharan Africa, Mediterranean, Middle East, and southeast and east Asia. β-thalassemias are prevalent in the populations of the Mediterranean, Middle East, and Southeast Asia.

=== Alpha-thalassemia ===
The α-globin chains are encoded by two closely linked genes HBA1 and HBA2 on chromosome 16; in a person with two copies on each chromosome, a total of four loci encode the α chain. Two alleles are maternal and two alleles are paternal in origin. Alpha-thalassemias result in decreased alpha-globin production, resulting in an excess of β chains in adults and excess γ chains in fetus and newborns.

- In infants and adults, the excess β chains form unstable tetramers called hemoglobin H or HbH comprising 4 beta chains.
- In the fetus, the excess γ chains combine hemoglobin Bart's comprising 4 gamma chains

Both HbH and Hb Bart's have a strong affinity for oxygen but do not release it, causing oxygen starvation in the tissues. They can also precipitate within the RBC damaging its membrane and shortening the life of the cell.

The severity of the α-thalassemias is correlated with the number of affected α-globin alleles: the greater, the more severe will be the manifestations of the disease.

Severity of alpha thalassemia
# of faulty alleles	Types of alpha thalassemia	Symptoms
1	Silent carrier	No symptoms
2	Alpha thalassemia trait	Minor anemia
3	Hemoglobin H disease	Mild to moderate anemia; may lead normal life
4	Hemoglobin Bart's hydrops fetalis	Death usually occurs in utero or at birth

=== Beta-thalassemia ===
β-globin chains are encoded by the HBB gene on chromosome 11; in a healthy person with two copies on each chromosome, two loci encode the β chain. In beta thalassemia, a single faulty gene can be either asymptomatic or cause mild disease; if both genes are faulty this causes moderate to severe disease.

Mutated alleles are called β^{+} when partial function is conserved and some beta-globin is generated, or β^{o} when no functioning protein is produced.

The situation of both alleles determines the clinical picture:

- β thalassemia major (Mediterranean anemia or Cooley anemia) is caused by a β^{o}/β^{o} genotype. No functional β chains are produced, and thus no hemoglobin A can be assembled. This is the most severe form of β-thalassemia.
- β thalassemia intermedia is caused by a β^{+}/β^{o} or β^{+}/β^{+} genotype. In this form, some hemoglobin A is produced.
- β thalassemia minor is caused by a β/β^{o} or β/β^{+} genotype. Only one of the two β globin alleles contains a mutation, so β chain production is not terribly compromised and patients may be relatively asymptomatic.

=== Delta-thalassemia ===
As well as alpha and beta chains present in hemoglobin, about 3% of adult hemoglobin is made of alpha and delta globin chains. Just as with beta thalassemia, mutations that affect the ability of this gene to produce delta chains can occur.

=== Combination hemoglobinopathies ===
A combination hemoglobinopathy occurs when someone inherits two different abnormal hemoglobin genes. If these are different versions of the same gene, one having been inherited from each parent it is an example of compound heterozygosity.

Both alpha- and beta- thalassemia can coexist with other hemoglobinopathies. Combinations involving alpha thalassemia are generally benign.

Some examples of clinically significant combinations involving beta thalassemia include:

- Hemoglobin C/ beta thalassemia: common in Mediterranean and African populations generally results in a moderate form of anemia with splenomegaly.
- Hemoglobin D/ beta thalassemia: common in the northwestern parts of India and Pakistan (Punjab region).
- Hemoglobin E/ beta thalassemia: common in Cambodia, Thailand, and parts of India, it is clinically similar to β thalassemia major or β thalassemia intermedia.
- Hemoglobin S/ beta thalassemia: common in African and Mediterranean populations, it is clinically similar to sickle-cell anemia.
- Delta-beta thalassemia is a rare form of thalassemia in which there is a reduced production of both the delta and beta globins. It is generally asymptomatic.

== Diagnosis ==
=== Prenatal and newborn screening ===
Checking for hemoglobinopathies begins during pregnancy, with a prenatal screening questionnaire which includes, among other things, a consideration of health issues in the child's parents and close relatives. During pregnancy, genetic testing can be done on samples taken of fetal blood, of amniotic fluid, or chorionic villus sampling. A routine heel prick test, in which a small sample of blood is collected a few days after birth, can detect some forms of hemoglobinopathy.

=== Diagnostic tests ===
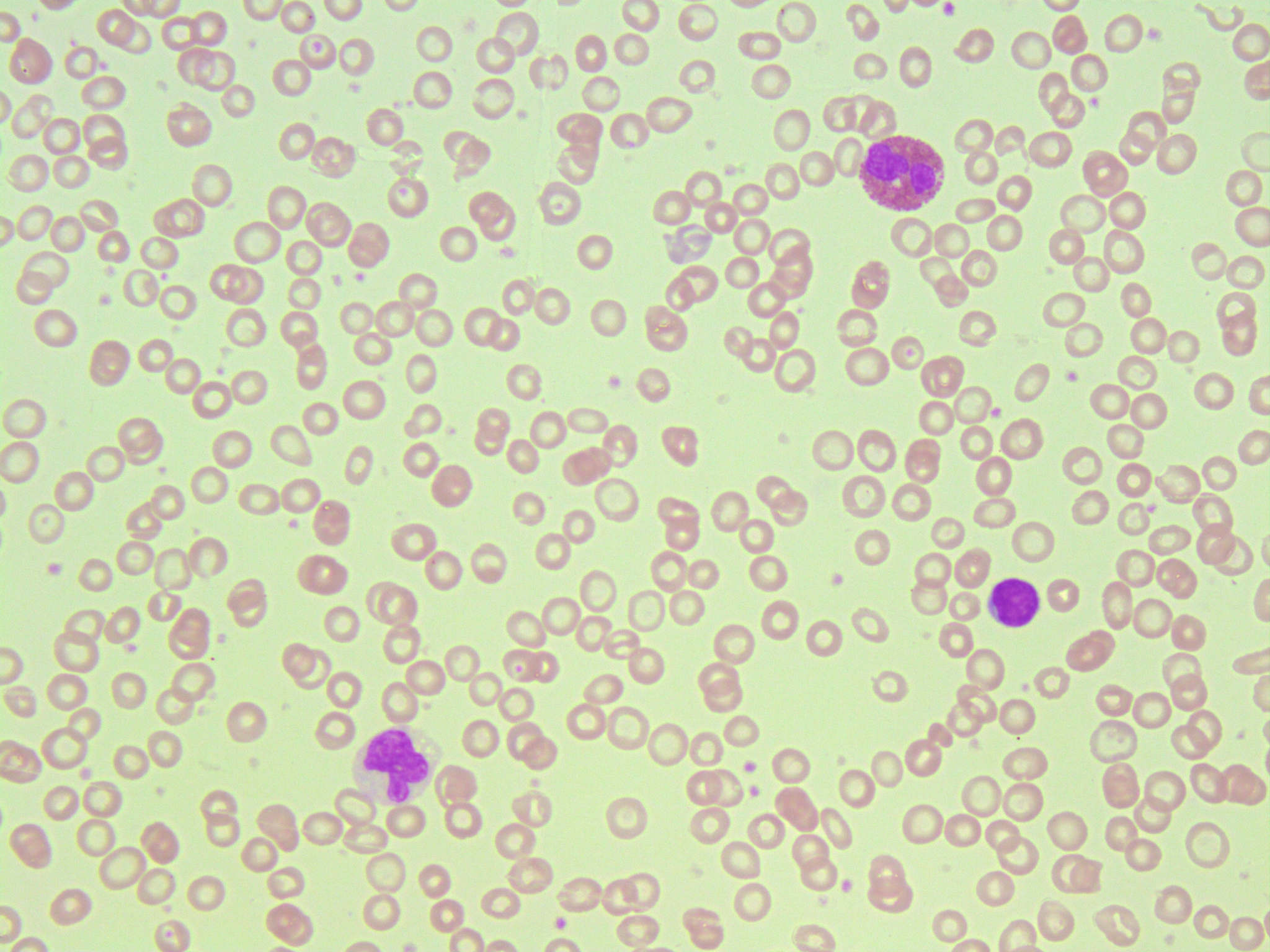
An image from a peripheral blood smear demonstrating microcytic, hypochromic red blood cells in thalassemia (50X oil immersion). An eosinophil, small lymphocyte, platelets and monocyte are also present.

The initial tests for thalassemias are:

- Complete blood count (CBC): Checks the number, size, and maturity of blood cells. Hemoglobin of less than 10 g/dl may indicate a carrier, below 7 g/dl is indicative of thalassemia major. In thalassemia major, mean corpuscular volume (MCV) are less than 70 fl, in thalassemia intermedia, MCV levels are below 80 fl (The normal range for MCV is 80–100 fl). The Mentzer index can be a pointer for diagnosis of thalassemia; it can be calculated from a CBC report.
- Peripheral blood smear: A blood smear examined under a microscope can show red blood cells that are abnormal in shape (poikilocytosis or codocytes), color (hypochromic), or size (microcytic), as well as those with abnormal inclusions (Heinz bodies).
- Serum iron and ferritin: these tests are needed to rule out iron-deficiency anemia.

For an exact diagnosis, the following tests can be performed:

- Hemoglobin electrophoresis is a test that can detect different types of hemoglobin. Hemoglobin is extracted from the red cells, then introduced into a porous gel and subjected to an electrical field. This separates the normal and abnormal types of hemoglobin which can then be identified and quantified. Due to reduced production of HbA in beta thalassemia, the proportion of HbA2 and HbF relative to HbA are generally increased above normal. In alpha thalassemia the normal proportion is maintained.
- High-performance liquid chromatography (HPLC) is reliable, fully automated, and able to distinguish most types of abnormal hemoglobin including carriers, The method separates and quantifies hemoglobin fractions by measuring their rate of flow through a column of absorbent material.
- DNA analysis using polymerase chain reaction (PCR) or next-generation sequencing. These tests can identify carriers of thalassemia genes and combination hemoglobinopathies, as well as identifying the exact mutation which underlies the disease.

== Management ==
Treatment for thalassemia depends on the severity of the disease. People with thalassemia traits (thalassemia minor or non transfusion dependent thalassemia), may not require medical or follow-up care after the initial diagnosis is made. Occasionally transfusions may be necessary particularly around childbirth, surgery, or if other conditions provoke anemia. A folic acid supplement may also be recommended.

For those with severe forms of thalassemia (thalassemia major, or transfusion-dependent thalassemia), the three principal treatments are red blood cell transfusions to relieve anemia, iron chelation to mitigate the side effects of transfusion, and folic acid supplementation to encourage the growth of new blood cells. Other forms of treatment available depending on individual circumstances.

=== Red blood cell transfusions ===
Blood transfusions are the main treatment approach for prolonging life. Donated healthy red blood cells have a functional life of 4 to 6 weeks before they wear out and are broken down in the spleen. Regular transfusions every three to four weeks are necessary in order to maintain hemoglobin at a healthy level. Transfusions come with risks including iron overload, the risk of acquiring infections, and the risk of immune reaction to the donated cells (alloimmunization).

=== Iron chelation ===
Multiple blood transfusions lead to severe iron overload, as the body eventually breaks down the hemoglobin in donated cells. This releases iron which it is unable to excrete. Iron overload may be treated by chelation therapy with the medications deferoxamine, deferiprone, or deferasirox. Deferoxamine is only effective as a daily injection, complicating its long-term use. Adverse effects include primary skin reactions around the injection site and hearing loss. Deferasirox and deferiprone are both oral medications, whose common side effects include nausea, vomiting and diarrhea.

=== Folic acid ===
Folate is a B group vitamin which is involved in the manufacture of red blood cells. Folate supplementation, in the form of folic acid, is often recommended in thalassemia.

=== Other treatments ===
==== Luspatercept ====
Luspatercept is a drug used to treat anemia in adults with β-thalassemia, it can improve the maturation of red blood cells and reduce the need for frequent blood transfusions. It is administered by injection every three weeks. Luspatercept was authorised for use in the US in 2019 and by the European Medicines Agency in 2020.

==== Hydroxyurea ====
Hydroxyurea is another drug that can sometimes be administered to relieve anemia caused by beta-thalassemia. This is achieved, in part, by reactivating fetal haemoglobin production; however its effectiveness is uncertain.

==== Osteoporosis ====
People with thalassemia are at a higher risk of osteoporosis. Treatment options include bisphosphonates and zinc supplementation.

==== Removal of the spleen ====
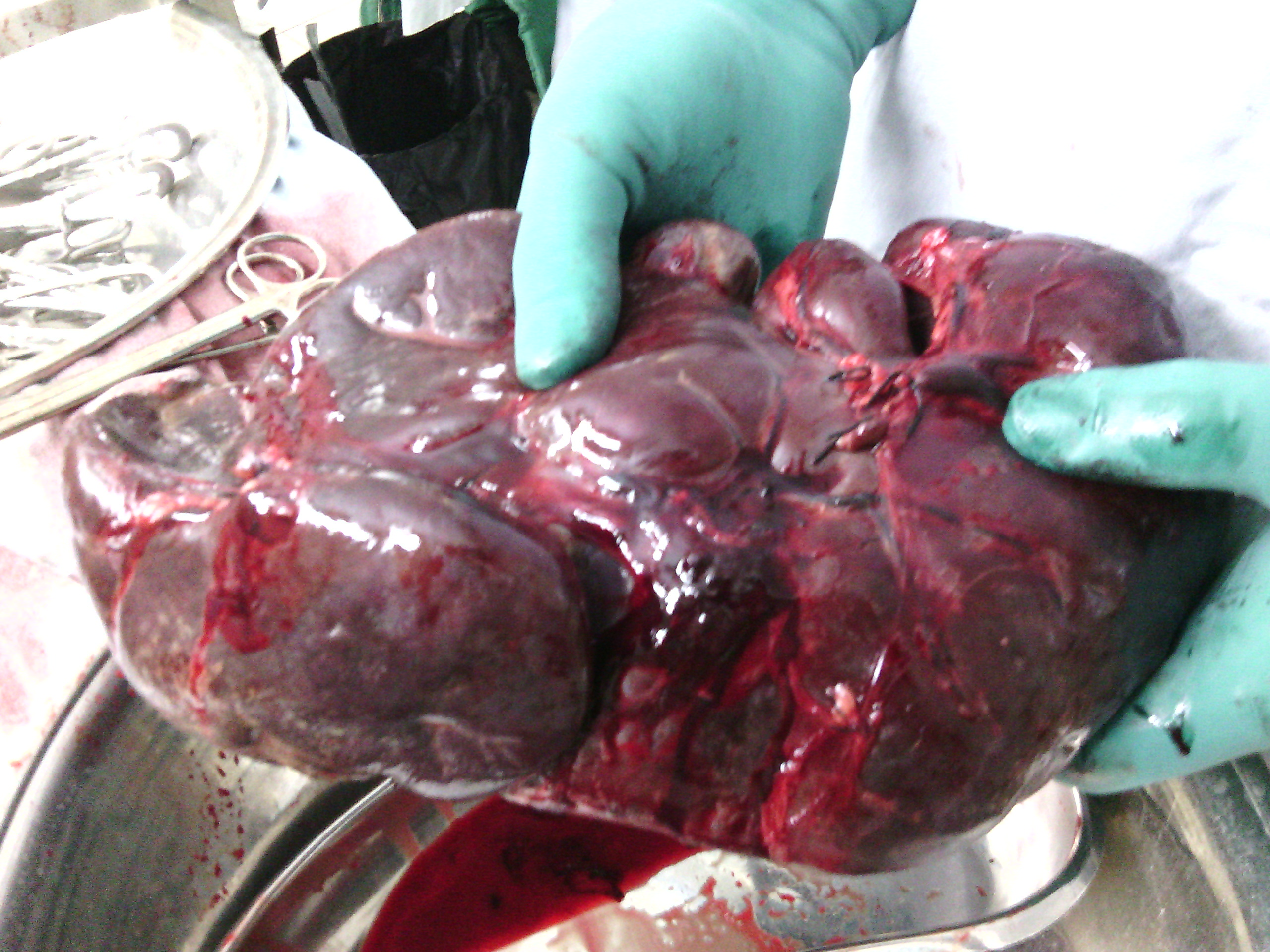
Surgically removed spleen of a thalassemic child. It is about 15 times larger than normal.

The spleen is the organ which removes damaged or misshapen red blood cells from the circulation. In thalassemia, this can lead to the spleen becoming enlarged, a condition known as splenomegaly. Slight enlargement of the spleen is not a problem, however if it becomes extreme then surgical removal of the spleen (splenectomy) may be recommended.

== Transplantation and gene therapy ==
Hematopoietic stem cells (HSC) are cells in the bone marrow that can develop into all types of blood cells, including red blood cells, white blood cells, and platelets. There are two possible ways to treat hemoglobinopathies by targeting HSCs. One is to transplant HSCs from a healthy donor into the patient's bone marrow; this was pioneered in 1981. More recently, it has become possible to use CRISPR gene editing technology to modify the patient's own HSCs in a way that increases production of functional beta-globin chains, leading to near normal levels of healthy hemoglobin.

All stem cell treatments must involve myeloablation of the patients' bone marrow in order to remove HSCs containing the faulty gene. This requires high doses of chemotherapy agents with side effects such as sickness and tiredness. A long hospital stay is necessary after infusion of the replacement HSCs while the cells take up residence in the bone marrow and start to make red blood cells with the stable form of haemoglobin.

=== Hematopoietic stem cell transplantation ===
Hematopoietic stem cell transplantation (HSCT) is a potentially curative treatment for both alpha and beta thalassemia. It involves replacing the dysfunctional stem cells in the bone marrow with healthy cells from a well-matched donor. Cells are ideally sourced from human leukocyte antigen matched relatives; the procedure is more likely to succeed in children rather than adults.

The first HSC transplant for thalassemia was carried out in 1981 on a patient with beta thalassemia major. Since then, a number of patients have received bone marrow transplants from healthy matched donors, although this procedure has a high level of risk.

In 2018 an unborn child with hydrops fetalis, a potentially fatal complication of alpha thalassemia, was successfully transfused in utero with her mother's stem cells.

HSCT is a dangerous procedure with many possible complications; it is reserved for patients with life-threatening diseases. Risks associated with HSCT can include graft-versus host disease, failure of the graft, and other toxicity related to the transplant. In one study of 31 people, the procedure was successful for 22 whose hemoglobin levels improved to the normal range, in seven the graft failed and they continued to live with thalassemia, and two died of transplantation-related causes.

=== Gene therapy ===
Gene therapy for hemoglobinopathies was first trialled in 2014 on a single patient with sickle cell disease (a fault in the beta globin gene), and followed by clinical trials in which a number of patients with either sickle cell or beta thalassemia were successfully treated.

Gene therapies work by first harvesting the patient's HSCs, then using CRISPR gene editing to modify their DNA in the laboratory. In parallel with this, the person with thalassemia disease undergoes a myeloablation procedure (a form of chemotherapy) to destroy the remaining HSCs in their bone marrow. The laboratory treated cells are then infused back into the patient where they colonise the bone marrow and eventually commence production of healthy blood cells. There are fewer risks from this procedure than from HSCT, since the transplanted cells are autologous having originated from the patient herself/himself.

There are two approved forms of gene therapy for beta thalassemia.

Betibeglogene autotemcel, sold under the brand name Zynteglo, is a gene therapy for the treatment for beta thalassemia which adds a healthy beta-globin gene to the HSCs. It was approved for medical use in the United States in August 2022. The procedure involves collecting hematopoietic stem cells (HSCs) from the affected person's blood. In the laboratory, these HSCs then have a new gene for T87Q-globin (a modified beta-globin) introduced to them using a lentiviral vector. Meanwhile the affected person undergoes myeloablative conditioning, after which the altered HSCs can be infused back, becoming engrafted in the bone marrow where they proliferate. This results in a progressive increase in beta-globin synthesis which improves the balance of alpha and beta globins in all subsequent developing red blood cells. Healthy hemoglobin A is generated resolving the anemia.

Exagamglogene autotemcel, sold under the brand name Casgevy, is a gene therapy for the treatment of transfusion-dependent beta thalassemia which induces increased production of fetal hemoglobin HbF. The treatment was approved in the United Kingdom for the treatment of transfusion-dependent beta thalassemia in November 2023 and in the United States in January 2024. Casgevy works by editing the BCL11A gene, which normally inhibits the production of HbF in adults. The edit has the effect of increasing production of gamma globin, a component of fetal hemoglobin HbF, and thereby resolving the anemia.

== Prevention ==
The American College of Obstetricians and Gynecologists recommends all people thinking of becoming pregnant be tested to see if they have thalassemia. Genetic counseling and genetic testing are recommended for families who carry a thalassemia trait. Understanding the genetic risk, ideally before a family is started, would hopefully allow families to understand more about the condition and make an informed decision that is best for their family.

A screening policy exists in Cyprus to reduce the rate of thalassemia, which, since the program's implementation in the 1970s (also including prenatal screening and abortion), has reduced the number of children born with the disease from one of every 158 births to almost zero. Greece also has a screening program to identify people who are carriers.

In Iran, as a premarital screening, the man's red cell indices are checked first. If he has microcytosis (mean cell hemoglobin < 27 pg or mean red cell volume < 80 fl), the woman is tested. When both are microcytic, their hemoglobin A2 concentrations are measured. If both have a concentration above 3.5% (diagnostic of thalassemia trait) they are referred to the local designated health post for genetic counseling.

Large-scale awareness campaigns are being organized in India both by government and non-government organizations to promote voluntary premarital screening, with marriage between carriers strongly discouraged.

== Epidemiology ==
The beta form of thalassemia is particularly prevalent among Mediterranean peoples, and this geographical association is responsible for its original name. Thalassemias resulted in 25,000 deaths in 2013, down from 36,000 deaths in 1990.

In Europe, the highest concentrations of the disease are found in Greece, coastal regions in Turkey (particularly the Aegean Region such as İzmir, Balıkesir, Aydın, Muğla, and Mediterranean Region such as Antalya, Adana, Mersin), in southern Spain, in parts of Italy, particularly southern Italy. With the exception of the Balearics, the major Mediterranean Islands, such as Sicily, Sardinia, Malta, Corsica, Cyprus, and Crete are heavily affected. Other Mediterranean peoples, as well as those in the vicinity of the Mediterranean, also have high rates of thalassemia, including people from North Africa and West Asia. Far from the Mediterranean, South Asians are also affected, with the world's highest concentration of carriers (16–18% of the population) in the Maldives.

The disease is also found in populations living in Africa, the Americas, and in Tharu people in the Terai region of Nepal and India. It is believed to account for much lower rates of malaria illnesses and deaths, accounting for the historic ability of Tharus to survive in areas with heavy malaria infestation while others could not. Thalassemias are particularly associated with people of Mediterranean origin, Arabs (especially Palestinians and people of Palestinian descent), and Asians. The estimated prevalence is 16% in people from Cyprus, 1% in Thailand, and 3–8% in populations from Bangladesh, China, India, Malaysia and Pakistan.

Estimates suggest that approximately 1.5% of the global population (80 – 90 million people) are β-thalassemia carriers. However, exact data on carrier rates in many populations are lacking, particularly in developing areas of the world known or expected to be heavily affected. Because of the prevalence of the disease in countries with little knowledge of thalassemia, access to proper treatment and diagnosis can be difficult. While there are some diagnostic and treatment facilities in developing countries, in most cases these are not provided by government services and are available only to patients who can afford them. In general, poorer populations only have access to limited diagnostic facilities and blood transfusions. In some developing countries, there are virtually no facilities for diagnosis or management of thalassemia.

=== History of thalassemia ===
Rudolf Von Jaksch in 1889 first described "anaemia leucaemic infantum" as a form of chronic anemia in children which combined with an enlarged spleen, and abnormal size and shape of the red blood cells. His discovery was subsequently found to comprise a collection of different conditions.

The first definitive identification of a thalassemia was in 1925 by Thomas Benton Cooley, an American pediatrician specialising in hematology and childhood anemias. Cooley noted similarities in symptoms of children in his care having Greek or Italian ancestry; he named it "erythroblastic anemia," but it became popularly known as Cooley's anemia (now termed beta thalassemia major).

The term "thalassemia" was coined by George Whipple in 1932. The word "thalassemia" comes from the Greek word thalassa, which means "sea". The suffix "-emia" comes from the Greek word haima, which means "blood". The term was coined because the condition was strongly associated with people of Mediterranean descent.

In 1948, Italian researchers established that the type of thalassemia which was prevalent in Italy was inherited in a recessive pattern.
