= Zindagi Live Foundation =

Non-Government organization

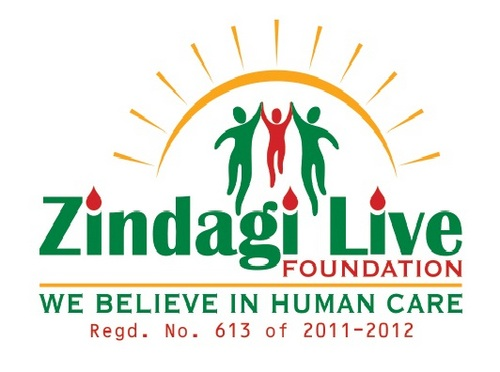
- Founded: 2011
- Type: Non-Governmental Organisation Zindagi Live Foundation on Instagram

Zindagi Live Foundation is a NGO based in Ludhiana, India which works for children affected with Thalassemia by giving them financial help and organizing blood donation camps.
