= Hemoglobin electrophoresis =

Blood test

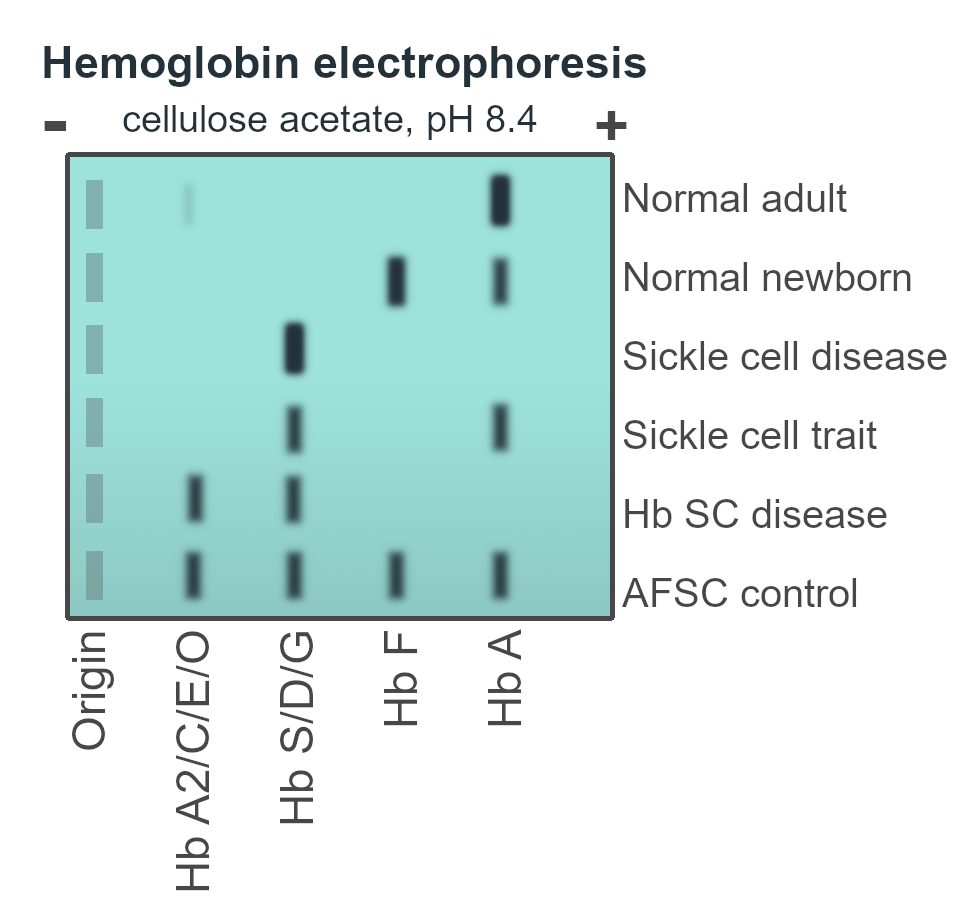
- Schematic of alkaline hemoglobin electrophoresis, showing expected results for a normal adult, normal newborn, person with sickle cell disease, person with sickle cell trait, person with hemoglobin SC disease, and control sample.
- Specialty: Hematology

Hemoglobin electrophoresis is a blood test that can detect different types of hemoglobin. The test can detect hemoglobin S, the form associated with sickle cell disease, as well as other abnormal types of hemoglobin, such as hemoglobin C. It can also be used to investigate thalassemias, which are disorders caused by defective hemoglobin production.

== Procedure ==
The test uses the principles of gel electrophoresis to separate out the various types of hemoglobin and is a type of native gel electrophoresis. After the sample has been treated to release the hemoglobin from the red cells, it is introduced into a porous gel (usually made of agarose or cellulose acetate) and subjected to an electrical field, most commonly in an alkaline medium. Different hemoglobins have different charges, and according to those charges, they move at different speeds in the gel and eventually form discrete bands (see electrophoretic migration patterns). A quality control sample containing hemoglobins A, F, S, and C is run along with the patient sample to aid in identifying the different bands. The relative amounts of each type of hemoglobin can be estimated by measuring the optical density of the bands, though this method is not reliable for hemoglobins that are present in low quantities.

Because hemoglobins exhibit different migration patterns depending on the pH level, testing the same sample at both an acid and an alkaline pH can help to identify some abnormal hemoglobins that would otherwise be impossible to distinguish from others.

== Clinical significance ==
Adult human blood normally contains three types of hemoglobin: hemoglobin A, which makes up approximately 95% of the total; hemoglobin A_{2}, which accounts for less than 3.5%; and a minute amount of hemoglobin F. If abnormal hemoglobin variants such as hemoglobin S (which occurs in sickle cell disease), C or E are present, they will appear as unexpected bands on electrophoresis (provided they do not migrate to the same place as other hemoglobins).

Hemoglobin electrophoresis can also be used to investigate thalassemias, which are caused by decreased production of subunits of the hemoglobin molecule. Hemoglobin A_{2} levels are typically elevated in beta-thalassemia minor and hemoglobin F may be slightly increased. In beta-thalassemia major, hemoglobin A is decreased (or in some cases absent) and hemoglobin F is markedly elevated; A2 levels are variable. In hemoglobin H disease, a form of alpha-thalassemia, an abnormal band of hemoglobin H can be detected, and sometimes a band of Hemoglobin Barts; but in the milder alpha-thalassemia trait, electrophoresis results are effectively normal.

== History ==
Linus Pauling is credited with the invention of hemoglobin electrophoresis in 1949. Newer alternatives to conventional hemoglobin electrophoresis include isoelectric focusing, capillary zone electrophoresis, and high-performance liquid chromatography.
