= Hemoglobin D-Punjab =

- Other names: Hemoglobin D disease
- Specialty: Hematology

Within the medical specialty of hematology, Hemoglobin D-Punjab, also known as hemoglobin D-Los Angeles, D-North Carolina, D-Portugal, D-Oak Ridge, and D-Chicago, is a hemoglobin variant. It originates from a point mutation in the human β-globin locus and is one of the most common hemoglobin variants worldwide. It is so named because of its higher prevalence in the Punjab region of India and Pakistan, along with northern China, and North America. It is also the most frequent hemoglobin variant in Xinjiang Uyghur Autonomous Region of China, with a 1997 study indicating that Hemoglobin D-Punjab accounts for 55.6% of the total hemoglobin variants.

Hemoglobin D is a result of a mutation in the one or both of the Beta-chains that make up hemoglobin molecules. Having one gene effected is referred to as trait; having two is referred to as homozygous "disease" although the symptoms of this disease are mild.

== History ==
Until the early 1950s, hemoglobin A and some of its variants had been identified, such as hemoglobin S and hemoglobin C. Hemoglobin D was discovered in 1951 with one source stating it was the third variant discovered, and another source claiming it was the fourth. Later in 1962, it was found that five other regional variants of hemoglobin D all had the same chemical structure termed hemoglobin D-Punjab.

== Hemoglobin D Trait ==
Hemoglobin is the main ingredient in red blood cells. Hemoglobin helps red blood cells carry oxygen from the lungs to other parts of the body. Normal red blood cells have hemoglobin A. People with hemoglobin D trait have red blood cells that have normal hemoglobin A (made up of normal alpha and beta chains) and abnormal hemoglobin D (made up of normal alpha chains and variant beta chains). People with hemoglobin D trait have slightly more hemoglobin A than hemoglobin D. The abnormal hemoglobin is called hemoglobin D.

People with Hemoglobin D trait do not have health problems related to having the trait. People with hemoglobin D trait do not have Hemoglobin D disease or sickle cell disease. They cannot develop these diseases later in life. While Hemoglobin D can be detected without a DNA test, one is needed to ascertain that a person who carries Hemoglobin D carries hemoglobin D-Punjab.

There is no clinical disease detected, however children of affected individuals have increased risk of having Hemoglobin D Disease, Hemoglobin SD disease or Beta-thalassemia Disease. Among the seven known types of Hemoglobin D, only Hemoglobin D Punjab can cause a serious hemoglobin disorder.

== Symptoms ==
usually present with mild hemolytic anemia and mild to moderate splenomegaly.

Even homozygous Hemoglobin D disease does not typically cause clinically significant symptoms. It is usually present with mild haemolytic anaemia and moderate splenomegaly. The anemia usually occurs in the first few months of life, as fetal hemoglobin decreases and hemoglobin D increases.

Hb D-Punjab becomes significant when it is co-inherited with Hb S or B thalassemia.

== See also ==
- Hb S
- Hb C
- Hb E
- Hb Lepore
