= Thomas Cooley =

Thomas Cooley may refer to:

- Thomas Cooley (architect) (1740–1784), Irish architect
- Thomas F. Cooley (1943–2021), American professor of economics at the New York University Stern School of Business
- Thomas M. Cooley (1824–1898), Chief Justice of the Michigan Supreme Court
- Thomas Benton Cooley (1871–1945), his son, American pediatrician and hematologist
- Thomas R. Cooley (1893–1959), United States Navy admiral
- Thomas M. Cooley Law School, Michigan, named for the justice
