= Sickle cell-beta thalassemia =

Sickle cell beta thalassemia
- Other names: Sickle cell-β thalassemia
- Specialty: Hematology

Sickle cell-beta thalassemia is an inherited blood disorder. The disease may range in severity from being relatively benign and like sickle cell trait to being similar to sickle cell disease.

== Signs and symptoms ==
Patients with sickle cell-beta thalassemia may present with painful crises similar to patients with sickle cell disease

== Cause ==
Sickle cell-beta thalassemia is caused by inheritance of a sickle cell allele from one parent and a beta thalassemia allele from the other.

=== Mutations ===
A sickle allele is always the same mutation of the beta-globin gene (glutamic acid to valine at amino acid six). In contrast, beta-thalassemia alleles can be created by many different mutations including both deletion and non-deletion forms.

== Diagnosis ==
Patient may present with symptomatic anemia or with sickle crises. In the United States and other countries with new-born screening programs, the disease may be identified in neonates.

Diagnostic tests include DNA sequencing, hemoglobin electrophoresis, and high-performance liquid chromatography.

== Treatment ==
Treatment is the same as for patients with sickle cell disease. Patients may receive hydroxyurea to induce the protective effects of increased fetal hemoglobin production. They may also benefit from blood transfusions especially during vaso-occlusive crises. Patients may be offered chemoprophylaxis with penicillin. They may have splenic dysfunction and splenectomy is frequently performed. Vaccination against encapsulated bacteria including Streptococcus pneumoniae is recommended.
