= Hemoglobin D =

- Specialty: Hematology
- Symptoms: HbD/HbA asymptomatic; HbD/HbD mild hemolytic anemia; HbD/HbS sickle cell anemia; HbD/Hb-thalassemia thalassemia
- Causes: Point mutation in HBB gene
- Treatment: Not required

Hemoglobin D (HbD) is a variant of hemoglobin, a protein complex that makes up red blood cells. Based on the locations of the original identification, it has been known by several names such as hemoglobin D-Los Angeles, hemoglobin D-Punjab, D-North Carolina, D-Portugal, D-Oak Ridge, and D-Chicago. Hemoglobin D-Los Angeles was the first type identified by Harvey Itano in 1951, and was subsequently discovered that hemoglobin D-Punjab is the most abundant type that is common in the Sikhs of Punjab (of both Pakistan and India) and of Gujarat.

Unlike normal adult human hemoglobin (HbA) which has glutamic acid at its 121 amino acid position, it has glutamine instead. The single amino acid substitution can cause various blood diseases, from fatal genetic anemia to mild hemolytic anemia, an abnormal destruction of red blood cells. Depending on the type of genetic inheritance, it can produce four different conditions: heterozygous (inherited in only one of the chromosome 11) HbD trait, HbD-thalassemia, HbS-D (sickle cell) disease, and, very rarely, homozygous (inherited in both chromosome 11) HbD disease. It is the fourth hemoglobin type discovered after HbA, HbC and HbS; the third hemoglobin variant identified after HbC and HbS; and the fourth most common hemoglobin variant after HbC, HbS, and HbO.

== History ==
Hemoglobin was discovered as some sort of crystal formed from earthworm body fluid and animal blood by German biochemist Friedrich Ludwig Hünefeld at Leipzig University in 1840. When the protein nature was established another German Felix Hoppe-Seyler gave the name hemoglobin (literally "blood protein") in 1864. Its role as an oxygen transporter was later established. While studying sickle cell disease, Linus Pauling and Harvey Itano at the California Institute of Technology discovered in 1949 that the disease was due to abnormal hemoglobin, later called hemoglobin S (HbS). In 1950, Itano and James V. Neel discovered a slightly different case in which individuals had sickled red blood cells but not anemia. The hemoglobin was named hemoglobin III, but later known as hemoglobin C (HbC).

In 1934, Jean V. Cooke and J. Keller Mack, pediatricians at St. Louis, USA, reported a case of white American family which had some member suffering from sickle cell anemia. Of six siblings, two children had anemia, while others, including their parents, were healthy. Blood tests indicated the two children had sickled red blood cells, but with uncharacteristically slow process of sickling. The father, who had no disease, was found to have sickled re blood cells. With the new techniques for identifying different hemoglobin, Itano investigated the family and found that like their father, three other children had abnormal hemoglobin but without the disease or sickled cells; their hemoglobin giving same mobility (in electrophoresis) and but different solubility as sickled cells. He recorded in 1951:

The resent report deals with the identification of still another form of human hemoglobin in five members of a family in which the genetic picture is not typical of sickle cell anemia, although two of the members have in the past been diagnosed as having sickle cell anemia. An earlier study of this family disclosed that the two anemic children and the father, who was not anemic, had sickling erythrocytes while the mother, two sisters and two brothers of the anemic children had non-sickling erythrocytes and were not anemic.

In the paper published in the Proceedings of the National Academy of Sciences of the United States of America, Itano presented the need to have naming convention for the different types of hemoglobin, and introduced the alphabet-coding system such as hemoglobin a (for normal adult type), b (sickle cell type), c (sickle cell-associated type) and d (for the novel type); as he explained:

In order to facilitate the discussion in the present paper and to avoid confusion in future works, it seems desirable at this time to establish a system of symbols for identifying the various forms of adult human hemoglobin... normal hemoglobin, sickle cell hemoglobin, the abnormal hemoglobin reported by Itano and Neel, and the abnormal hemoglobin reported in the present paper will be designated adult human hemoglobins a, b, c and d, respectively, more briefly as hemoglobins a, b, c and d.

It was the discovery of hemoglobin D and creation of hemoglobin naming system. In 1953, Amoz Immanuel Chernoff at the Washington University School of Medicine, St. Louis, introduced the capitalised-letter designation such as A (for normal adult type), C (second abnormal type), D (third abnormal type), S (sickle cell type) and F (fetal form). Although the nomenclature system became a convention, hemoglobin D, in particular, became known by various names, generally based on their origin of identification; like hemoglobin D-Los Angeles for the first discovered, hemoglobin D-Punjab, D-North Carolina, D-Portugal, D-Oak Ridge, and D-Chicago. By 1961, it was known that the structural difference of HbD from HbA was in the β-chain. Around the same time, Corrado Baglioni of Massachusetts Institute of Technology identified the exact abnormality that substitution of glutamic acid with glutamine at position 121 in the β-chain was the basis of HbD, the findings which he reported in 1962.

== Structure ==
Hemoglobin D has the basic structure and composition of normal adult hemoglobin. It is a globular protein containing prosthetic (non-protein) group called heme. There are four individual peptide chains, namely two α- and two β-subunits, each made of 141 and 146 amino acid residues, respectively. One heme is associated with each chain and responsible for binding free oxygen in the blood. A single HbD is therefore a tetramer (containing four molecules), denoted as α_{2}β_{2}. Each subunit has a molecular weight of about 16,000 Da (daltons), making the tetramer about 64,000 Da (64,458 g/mol) in size. HbD is different from HbA only on the β-subunit where the amino acid glutamic acid at 121 position is replaced with glutamine (α_{2}β_{2}^{121Glu→Gln}). It has the same chemical characteristic as HbS (a hemoglobin of sickle cell trait), with one fewer negative charge at an alkaline pH than HbA. However, unlike HbS, it does not produce sickled RBC on its own under low level of oxygen.

== Genetics and diseases ==
Hemoglobin D is synthesised due to mutation in HBB, the gene that produces β-subunits of hemoglobin and is present on human chromosome 11. A point mutation in the first base of the 121 codon that normally has GAA sequence for normal hemoglobin is changed to CAA. GAA codes for glutamic acid, while CAA for glutamine. This gene mutation makes HbD, which can further give rise to several genetic and disease conditions. The specific mutations can occur at different sites of the gene. According to the Globin Gene Server database, there are other types of HbD such as HbD-Agri (HBB:c.29C→A;364G→C), HbD-Bushman (HBB:c.49G→C), HbD-Ouled Rabah (HBB:c.60C→A or 60C→G), HbD-Iran (HBB:c.67G→C), HbD-Granada (HBB:c.68A→T), HbD-Ibadan (HBB:c.263C→A) and HbD-Neath (HBB:c.365A→C).

Depending on the nature of inheritance of HbD mutation there are four conditions, some of which can be deadly diseases:

1. Heterozygous HbD/HbA trait, which does not affect the individuals.
2. Heterozygous HbD-thalassemia, which causes the symptoms of thalassemia generally with mild anemia.
3. Heterozygous HbS-D, which gives rise to sickle cell anemia, but generally milder and slower symptoms.
4. Homozygous HbD/HbD, which is the rarest form, but is associated with HbD disease.

== Effects and symptoms ==
Hemoglobin in combination with normal hemoglobin (heterozygous HBD/HbA) is asymptomatic, causing no effects. Individuals have normal hemoglobin level and their red blood cells are normal spherical structure. Homozygous HbD/HbD causes mild hemolytic anemia and chronic non-progressive splenomegaly (enlargement of spleen). Heterozygous HbD/HbS causes sickle cell anemia. However, most cases of the disease are milder than the usual HbS/HbS conditions. The most serious complication noted is stroke. HbD-thalassemia causes microcytic anemia which is generally milder that in typical thalassemia.

=== Diagnosis ===
As hemoglobin can be inherited in several conditions, no single diagnostic test can confirm the specific protein completely. Electrophoresis is one of the most commonly used and requires sequential identification with other hemoglobins. All hemoglobins can be separated in cellulose acetate at pH 8.6 and in agarose gel at pH 6.2. In alkaline medium of cellulose acetate, HbD moves slower and can be identified at shorter distance than HbA, but it migrates exactly as HbS. It can be differentiated from HbS in acidic agarose gel in which it moves faster and farther than HbS, but at the same level with HbA. High-performance liquid chromatography (HPLC) can directly detect the protein, but its specific identification of HbD from other hemoglobins can be inconclusive. HPLC coupled with mass spectrometry (HPLC-ESI-MS/MS) can accurately detect the protein but the procedure is costly and time consuming. Genetic screening can be done with polymerase chain reaction that can identify HbS from other hemoglobin variants.

=== Management ===
Hemoglobin D conditions such as homozygous and HbD/HbA heterozygous do not require medical intervention. HbD/HbS and HbD-thalassemia conditions are managed like the typical cases of sickle cell anemia and thalassemia. In case of sickle cell anemia, daily treatment with penicillin recommended up to five years of age. Dietary supplementation of folic acid is recommended by the WHO. In 2019, Crizanlizumab, a monoclonal antibody was approved by the United States FDA for reducing the frequency of blood vessel blockage in 16 years and older individuals. For thalassemia, regular lifelong blood transfusions is the usual treatment. Bone marrow transplants can be curative for some children. Medications like deferoxamine, deferiprone and luspatercept. Gene therapy, exagamglogene autotemcel is approved for medical use in the United Kingdom since November 2023.

== Prevalence ==
Hemoglobin D is most abundant among Sikhs, with occurrence of 2% in Punjab and 1% in Gujarat. It is also found in small number of individuals among Africans, Americans and Europeans who usually had close ethnicity with Indians in the past. It is below 2% among African-Americans. Combination with β-thalassemia and HbS are known in south and east India; the first resulting in thalassemia and the latter in sickle cell anemia.

There is also high occurrence in China, with prevalence rate of 12.5% in Chongqing. It is sporadically recorded in some Turkish, Algerian, West African, Saudi Arabian, native American, English, and Irish population. Rare conditions like HbD/HbJ, HbD/ HbQ, and HbD/Hb Fontainebleau are also found in India. A rare case of HbS/HbD is reported from Pakistan in which individuals are diagnosed with bone infection (osteomyelitis). An isolated condition of HbD/HbC is recorded in US.
