= Hemoglobin A2 =

Variant of hemoglobin A

Hemoglobin A2 (HbA_{2}) is a normal variant of hemoglobin A that consists of two alpha and two delta chains (α_{2}δ_{2}) and is found at low levels in normal human blood after infancy. Hemoglobin A2 may be increased in beta thalassemia or in people who are heterozygous for the beta thalassemia gene.

HbA2 exists in small amounts in all adult humans (1.5–3.1% of all hemoglobin molecules) and is approximately normal in people with sickle-cell disease. Its biological importance is not yet known.

HbA2 may seem physiologically minor, but it plays a very crucial role in identifying the beta-thalassemia traits, also known as BTT, and identifying other hemoglobin disorders. Human hemoglobin is made up of two different chains, this includes alpha-globin and beta-globin. In the blood, there are two different variants, HbA and HbA2, and these variants only differ by 10 amino acids. These two variants have distinctions with the alpha and beta-globin chains. HbA2 is a vital component for screening programs targeting beta-thalassemia and hemoglobin pathogens. Typically the normal HbA2 levels range from 2.1% to 3.2%, but these values may change based on individual factors and different hemoglobin or hematological patterns. Testing HbA2 levels can be challenging because different disorders can cause it to have higher or lower values. Testing for the beta-thalassemia trait is usually identified when the value of HbA2 is higher than 3.5%. HbA2 is also important for diagnosing sickle cell disease, which is one of the most prevalent genetic conditions. Sickle cell disease exhibits characteristics of either homozygous hemoglobin S, also known as Hb S, or Hb S paired with another hemoglobin variant. In diagnosing patients with sickle cell, HbA2 is taken into account alongside a complete blood count, family history, and clinical data.

== Excess ==
Elevated HbA2 levels that surpass 3.5%, indicate a potential mutation in the beta-globin genes. This potential mutation typically occurs in the -87 and -88 promoter region, which affects the proximal CACCC box. Another factor leading to increased HbA2 levels involves the deletion of bases that are placed adjacent to the beta-globin genes. This deletion results in a heightened HbA2 levels due to removing the locus control regions in the beta promoter. This specific promoter is crucial for gene interactions with both gamma and beta globin genes, which also enables both genes to be expressed.

== Deficiency ==
Low values of HbA2, defined as 2.1% and below, can stem from various factors. The different reasons for reduced HbA2 levels depend on the factors such as hematological indices, hemoglobin patterns, red blood cells, and iron status. Reports suggest that individuals with low iron levels often exhibit low levels of HbA2. Additionally, low levels of HbA2 may be caused from decreased transcription or translation of the globin chains, which would affect how they bind.

== Thalassemia ==
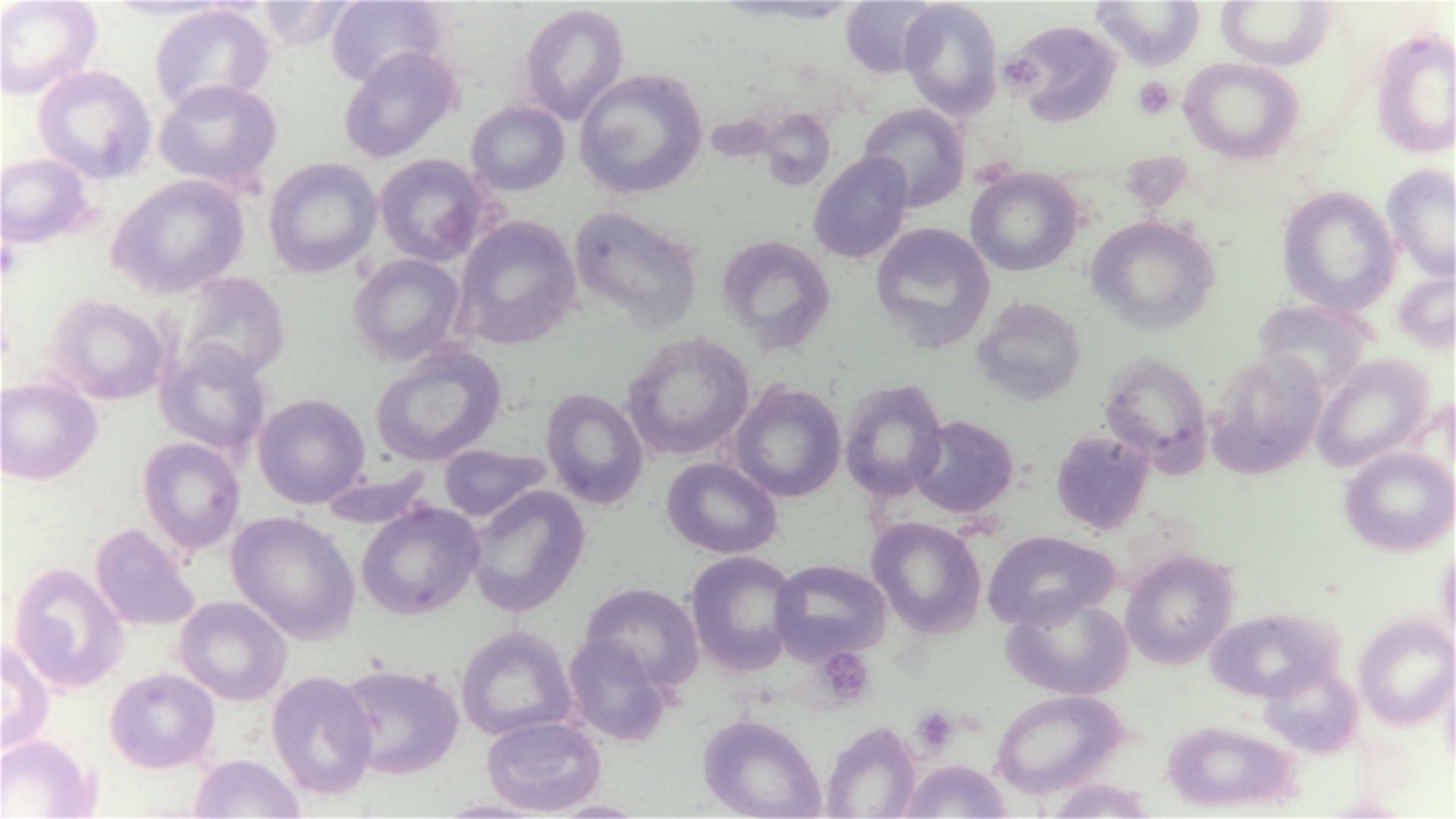
Blood smear from an individual with Beta-Thalassemia

Hemoglobin pathogens are disorders caused by inherited autosomal recessive genes or hemoglobin structures that have been altered and changed. Autosomal recessive inheritance means acquiring two changed genes from each parent. If both parents are carriers for the autosomal recessive gene, there is a 75% chance the child will be normal and a 25% chance of having and expressing the disorder. There are various autosomal recessive disorders and hemoglobin pathogens, among these, beta-thalassemia is associated with changes in HbA2 levels in our blood. Thalassemia is a disorder involving both alpha and beta globin chains, is characterized by a deficiency in the globin chains within the hemoglobin, not characterized by the structural change to these chains. This deficiency leads to two disorders: beta-thalassemia and alpha-thalassemia. Beta-thalassemia has beta globin chains that are reduced and alpha-thalassemia has alpha globin chains that are also reduced. This disorder is the most common autosomal recessive disorder in some countries. Hemoglobin A2 is employed to diagnose thalassemia disorders, encompassing both beta and alpha types. In beta-thalassemia, affected individuals express elevated HbA2 levels, which can be a potential indicator of the heterozygous gene marker for the disorder. Normal levels range from 2.1-3.2%, but in the beta-thalassemia disorder, the levels increase to 3.5-6.0%. Additionally, individuals with beta-thalassemia exhibit a high red cell count and low hemoglobin levels. Individuals that express lower levels of hemoglobin A2, have the a^{0}-thalassemia trait or homozygous gene for a^{+}-thalassemia.

== Laboratory methods ==
Hemoglobin A2 has a crucial role in screening and diagnosis of the beta-thalassemia trait. Various laboratory methods exist, each providing different outcomes of accuracy. The different quantification methods of HbA2 relies on how effective it can be separated from other hemoglobin variants. Various laboratory methods are employed, such as cation exchange high-performance liquid chromatography (HPLC), microcolumn chromatography, and cellulose acetate electrophoresis with elution. At first, cellulose acetate electrophoresis was utilized to measure HbA2, but this process proved to be too time-consuming and labor-intensive, making it impractical for large examinations or samples. Similar efficiency issues were encountered with other methods like IEF and scanning densitometry. These two methods separate proteins based on their isoelectric point. Chromatography, another commonly used method, demonstrated reliability in diagnosing individuals with the beta carrier gene. However, this method was also time-consuming and inefficient when dealing with large sample numbers. Out of the various methods, the one that accurately measures HbA2 is HPLC. It is a reliable technique because it's able to accurately determine HbA2, HbF, and Hb variants. The various different Hb variants include: HbS, HbE, Hb Lepore, HbC, HbD and HbO-Arab. There are several different factors that can contribute to the quantification of HbA2 to be inaccurately measured. These factors include column defects, batch variations, sample concentrations, dilution, calibration discrepancies, and the overall conditions of the samples.
