= Microcytosis =

- Specialty: Hematology

Microcytosis or microcythemia is a condition in which red blood cells are unusually small as measured by their mean corpuscular volume.

When associated with anemia, it is known as microcytic anemia.

== Causes ==
Microcytic anemia is not caused by reduced DNA synthesis.

Thalassemia can cause microcytosis. Depending upon how the terms are being defined, thalassemia can be considered a cause of microcytic anemia, or it can be considered a cause of microcytosis but not a cause of microcytic anemia. There are many causes of microcytosis, which is essentially only a descriptor. Cells can be small because of mutations in the formation of blood cells (hereditary microcytosis) or because they are not filled with enough hemoglobin, as in iron-deficiency-associated microcytosis.

Red blood cells can be characterised by their haemoglobin content as well as by their size. The haemoglobin content is referred to as the cell's colour. Therefore, there are both "normochromic microcytotic red cells" and "hypochromic, microcytotic red cells". The normochromic cells have a normal concentration of haemoglobin, and are therefore 'red enough' while the hypochromic cells do not; thus the value of the mean corpuscular hemoglobin concentration.The most common cause of microcytosis is iron deficiency anemia.

== See also ==
- Macrocytosis
