= Thomas Benton Cooley =

American physician

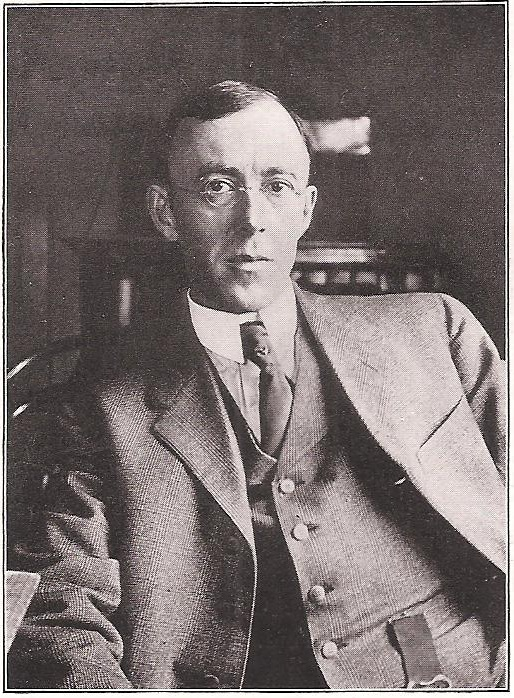
- Thomas Benton Cooley, c. 1906
- Born: June 23, 1871; Ann Arbor, Michigan, United States
- Died: October 13, 1945 (aged 74); Bangor, Maine
- Education: University of Michigan
- Known for: Pediatrician, Professor of Medicine
- Spouse: Abigail Hubbard
- Parent(s): Thomas McIntyre Cooley, Mary Elizabeth (Horton) Cooley

Thomas Benton Cooley (June 23, 1871 – October 13, 1945) was an American pediatrician and hematologist and professor of hygiene and medicine at the University of Michigan and Wayne State University. He was the director of the Pasteur Institute at the University of Michigan from 1903 to 1904. He worked in private practice in Detroit as the city's first pediatrician starting in 1905. He worked with the Babies' Milk Fund and helped to reduce Detroit's high infant mortality rate in the 1900s and 1910s. During World War I, Cooley went to France as the assistant chief of the Children's Bureau of the American Red Cross. He was decorated in 1924 with the cross of the Legion of Honor for his work in France. From 1921 to 1941, Cooley was the head of pediatric service at Children's Hospital of Michigan. Cooley gained acclaim for his scientific work in the field of pediatric hematology and is principally remembered for his discovery of, and research into, a form of childhood anemia that became known as Cooley's anemia. Cooley was also a professor at the Wayne University College of Medicine from 1936 to 1941.

== Early years ==
Cooley was born in Ann Arbor, Michigan, the son of Thomas McIntyre Cooley, a noted legal scholar. While Cooley was a boy, his father served variously as a professor and dean of the University of Michigan Law School, an Associate Justice and Chief Justice of the Michigan Supreme Court, and as the first chairman of the Interstate Commerce Commission. Cooley attended the Ann Arbor public schools and graduated from Ann Arbor High School. He enrolled at the University of Michigan, where he received a Bachelor of Arts degree in 1891 and Doctor of Medicine degree in 1895.

After receiving his medical degree, Cooley was an intern at the Boston City Hospital from 1895 to 1897. He returned to the University of Michigan as an instructor of hygiene from 1898 to 1900. In 1900, he left Michigan to study and visit clinics for a year in Germany. In 1902, he returned to Boston City Hospital as a resident physician and also undertook further training in contagious diseases.

== Medical career ==
=== Pasteur Institute ===
In 1903, Cooley returned to the University of Michigan as an assistant professor of hygiene, and he was there placed in charge of the Pasteur Institute at the University of Michigan. During 1903 and 1904, Cooley used funding of $2,500 to provide Pasteur treatment to individuals who had been, or were believed to have been, infected with rabies. In 1904, Cooley published a report detailing the results of providing 38 patients with the Pasteur treatment. Of the 38 patients treated, 36 had been bitten by dogs, one by a cat, and one by a horse. In none of the cases did the patient develop rabies.

=== Babies' Milk Fund ===
In 1905, he moved to Detroit where he practiced as a pediatrician. He served as the medical director of the Babies' Milk Fund. His efforts were credited with playing a "great role in the reduction of infant deaths from the diarrheal diseases in the early decades of the twentieth century."

=== World War I ===
During World War I, he served as the assistant chief of the Children's Bureau of the American Red Cross in France. During the war, medical and nursing personnel "vanished from the cities" in France, leaving an absence of care for the civilian population. A population of 400,000 "war orphans" added to the scope of the problem. After he returned from France in 1919, the Detroit Free Press published a full-page story on Cooley's efforts under the headline, "CHILDREN OF FRANCE ARE FOREVER HIS DEBTOR." The Free Press wrote:

Few persons realize that it was a modest, slow speaking Detroit doctor who was in a great measure responsible for much of the work that was done for those children of France. This unostentatious man is Dr. Thomas B. Cooley, child specialist of note. He returned from France scarcely a month ago and immediately put off his togs of khaki which bore a major's insignia and settled back into private life and practice as simply as if he had but come home from a summer vacation.

In addition to providing the children of France with medical care, the Children's Bureau also established camps, barracks and temporary hospitals. Cooley's projects in France included the establishment of a school of children's public health, transformation of the Edith Cavell hospital from a military hospital to a pediatric hospital, and creation of a model boarding home to house the war orphans. In the 19th arrondissement of Paris, the poorest district in the city, Cooley led a concentrated effort to deliver services to the children. He recalled,

The first thing that was necessary for us to do was to open dispensaries. ... But still there was that shortage of nurses. It wasn't enough to have children brought to the dispensary when they were taken back to unsanitary homes, homes where mothers failed to understand even the first elements of child care and feeding. We needed some agency which would go into the home to see that the physician's instructions were carried out in the best possible manner. Thus we hit upon the plan of training French women as visiting housekeepers.

Cooley established a training school for the visiting housekeepers in a vacant house owned by a Protestant church in Paris. There, Cooley oversaw the training of the women in the basic elements of hygiene, dietetics and sanitation. The Children's Bureau also opened a pre-natal clinics where classes were taught in dietetics and English, and a kindergarten opened.

Cooley received the cross of the Legion of Honour in 1924 from the government of France.

=== Hematology and Cooley's anemia ===
In 1921, after returning from France, Cooley became the head of pediatric service at the Children's Hospital of Michigan, a position he held for 20 years. Cooley developed a sub-specialty in hematology and childhood anemias. Cooley is most remembered for his findings with respect to a form of childhood anemia involving peculiar bone changes. Cooley noted similarities in appearance and clinical course of four children of Greek and Italian ancestry. The children had severe anemia combined with massive hepatosplenomegaly, bone deformities and severe growth retardation. Cooley called the disorder "erythroblastic anemia," but it became popularly known as Cooley's anemia. Cooley presented his findings to the American Pediatric Society in 1925. The American Journal of Diseases of Children called Cooley's work "one of the outstanding contributions to hematology by an American." In their treatise on hematology of infancy and childhood, Nathan & Oski wrote: "More lasting and far more important, of course, was the contribution made to pediatric hematology – and indeed to medical science as a whole – by Thomas B. Cooley of Detroit in 1925, when he salvaged from this wastebasket the distinct entity known as thalassemia."

In 1936, Cooley also became a professor of pediatrics at the Wayne State University College of Medicine. He was also a charter member of the American Academy of Pediatrics and a member of the American Pediatric Society; he served as president of both organizations. In 1941, at age 70, Cooley became the emeritus chief of pediatric service at Children's Hospital and an emeritus professor at Wayne State.

Cooley was described as an articulate, well educated, highly intelligent man who read four languages and "maintained a global correspondence." He undertook his work without formal training in hematology and with minimal equipment:

His equipment consisted of a monocular microscope of ancient vintage, a staining rack, a rather small card file, and -- in an otherwise vacant room upstairs intended for the affairs of the Child Research Council of the American Academy of Pediatrics -- a couch on which he took siestas and did much of his thinking.

Nathan & Oski summarized Cooley's approach and influence:

Cooley's influence extended well beyond the field of hematology. ... He was one of the founders of the Academy of Pediatrics and, long before the time was ripe, saw the role of pediatrics in terms of preventative medicine. Politically he was a liberal, scientifically a radical, personally a patrician. Combined with a rather haughty expression, an irrepressible wit, and an utter lack of reverence for established authority, these traits were bound to earn him enmities on the part of the town and gown alike, but his enemies respected him and his friends admired him. He was well ahead of his time, a lucid thinker and a giant in the history of pediatric hematology.

== Family and death ==
Cooley was married to Abigail Hubbard in December 1903. The couple had a daughter, Emily Holland Cooley, and a son, Thomas McIntyre Cooley II. Cooley lived in a tasteful house in Detroit's Indian Village neighborhood and owned a summer cottage on the coast of Maine.

Cooley died in October 1945 in Bangor, Maine.
