= Hemoglobin E =

Hemoglobin E disease
- Other names: Haemoglobin E
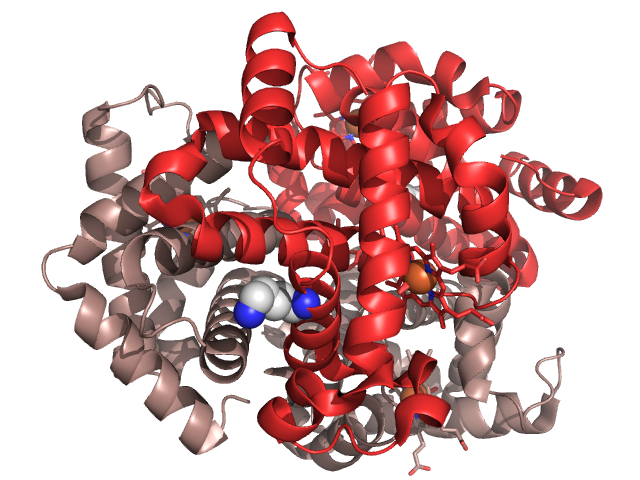
- Crystal structure of Hemoglobin E mutant (Glu26Lys) PDB entry 1vyt. Alpha chain in pink, beta chain in red. The lysine mutation highlighted as white spheres.
- Specialty: Hematology

Hemoglobin E (HbE) is an abnormal hemoglobin with a single point mutation in the β chain. At position 26 there is a change in the amino acid, from glutamic acid to lysine (E26K). Hemoglobin E is very common among people of Southeast Asian, Northeast Indian, Sri Lankan and Bangladeshi descent.

The βE mutation affects β-gene expression creating an alternate splicing site in the mRNA at codons 25-27 of the β-globin gene. Through this mechanism, there is a mild deficiency in normal β mRNA and production of small amounts of anomalous β mRNA. The reduced synthesis of β chain may cause β-thalassemia. Also, this hemoglobin variant has a weak union between α- and β-globin, causing instability when there is a high amount of oxidant. HbE can be detected on electrophoresis.

== Hemoglobin E disease (EE) ==
First thirty amino acid of normal Hb (on top) and of HbE (down).

Hemoglobin E disease results when the offspring inherits the gene for HbE from both parents. At birth, babies homozygous for the hemoglobin E allele do not present symptoms because they still have HbF (fetal hemoglobin). In the first months of life, fetal hemoglobin disappears and the amount of hemoglobin E increases, so the subjects start to have a mild β-thalassemia. Subjects homozygous for the hemoglobin E allele (two abnormal alleles) have a mild hemolytic anemia and mild enlargement of the spleen.

== Hemoglobin E trait: heterozygotes for HbE (AE) ==
Heterozygous AE occurs when the gene for hemoglobin E is inherited from one parent and the gene for hemoglobin A from the other. This is called hemoglobin E trait, and it is not a disease. People who have hemoglobin E trait (heterozygous) are asymptomatic and their state does not usually result in health problems. They may have a low mean corpuscular volume (MCV) and very abnormal red blood cells (target cells), but clinical relevance is mainly due to the potential for transmitting E or β-thalassemia.

== Sickle-Hemoglobin E Disease (SE) ==
Compound heterozygotes with sickle-hemoglobin E disease result when the gene of hemoglobin E is inherited from one parent and the gene for hemoglobin S from the other. As the amount of fetal hemoglobin decreases and hemoglobin S increases, a mild hemolytic anemia appears in the early stage of development. Patients with this disease experience some of the symptoms of sickle cell anemia, including mild-moderate anemia, increased risk of infection, and painful sickling crises.

== Hemoglobin E/β-thalassemia ==
Heredity of hemoglobin E/β-thalassemia

People who have hemoglobin E/β-thalassemia have inherited one gene for hemoglobin E from one parent and one gene for β-thalassemia from the other parent; affecting more than a million people in the world. Symptoms of hemoglobin E/β-thalassemia vary widely in severity, from mild anemia to full thalassemia major; they can include growth retardation, enlargement of the spleen (splenomegaly) and liver (hepatomegaly), jaundice, bone abnormalities, and cardiovascular problems. Recommended course of treatment depends on the nature and severity of the symptoms and may involve close monitoring of hemoglobin levels, folic acid supplements, and potentially regular blood transfusions.

== Epidemiology ==
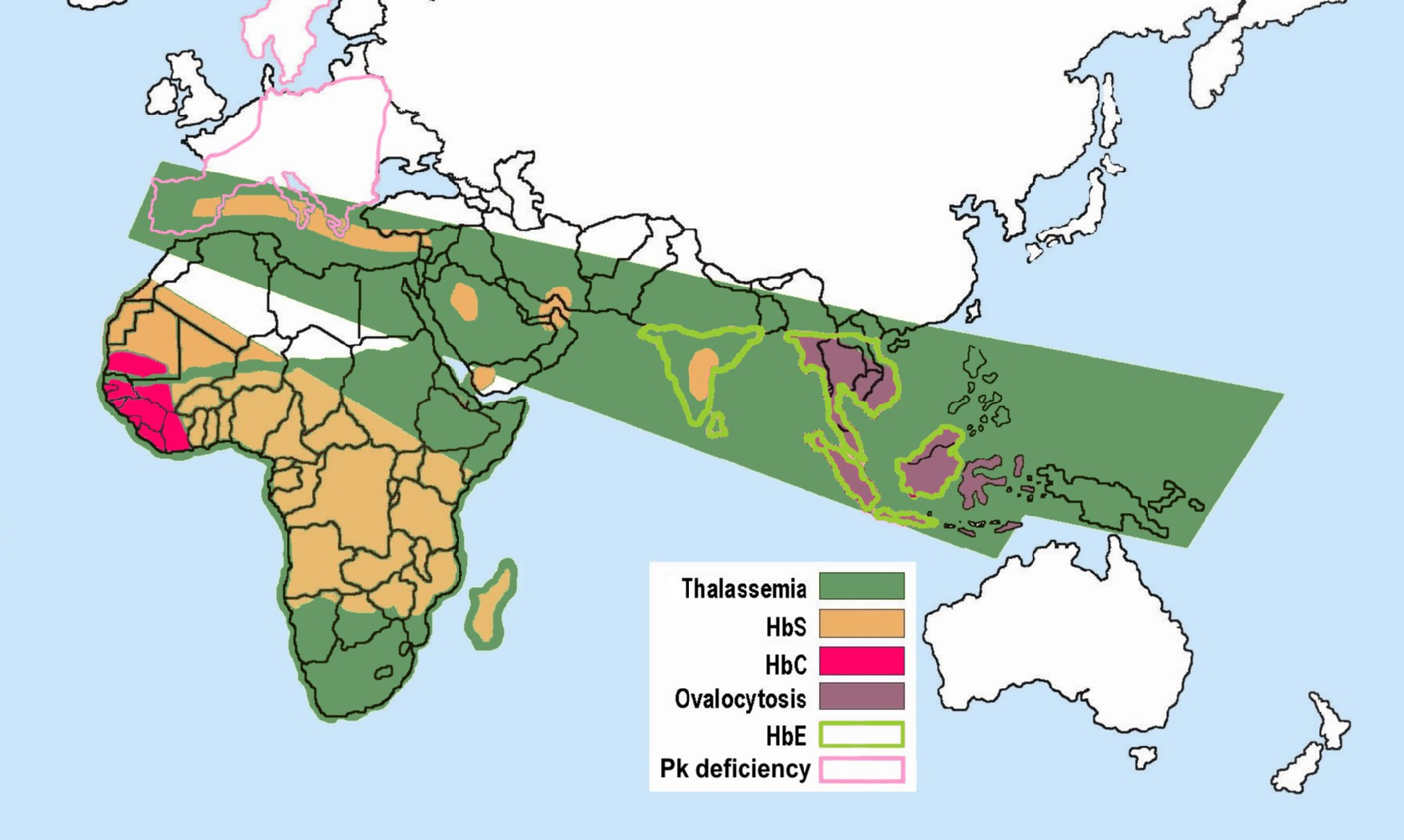
Distribution of red blood cell abnormalities worldwide

Hemoglobin E is most prevalent in mainland Southeast Asia (Thailand, Myanmar, Cambodia, Laos, Vietnam), Sri Lanka, Northeast India and Bangladesh. In mainland Southeast Asia, its prevalence can reach 30 or 40%, and Northeast India, in certain areas it has carrier rates that reach 60% of the population. In Thailand the mutation can reach 50 or 70%, and it is higher in the northeast of the country. In Sri Lanka, it can reach up to 40% and affects those of Sinhalese and Vedda descent. It is also found at high frequencies in Bangladesh and Indonesia. The trait can also appear in people of Turkish, Chinese and Filipino descent. The mutation is estimated to have arisen within the last 5,000 years. In Europe, there have been found cases of families with hemoglobin E, but in these cases, the mutation differs from the one found in South-East Asia. This means that there may be different origins of the βE mutation. Recent studies have shown that it may be possible to directly correct the haemoglobin E mutation with genome editing technology.

=== Protection against malaria ===
A number of studies have shown that the HbE mutation provides a degree of protection against infection with malaria, in common with some other hemoglobinopathies. It is therefore probable that natural selection for the gene may explain why it is most prevalent in parts of the world where malaria has historically been endemic.
