= Durian =

Tropical fruit

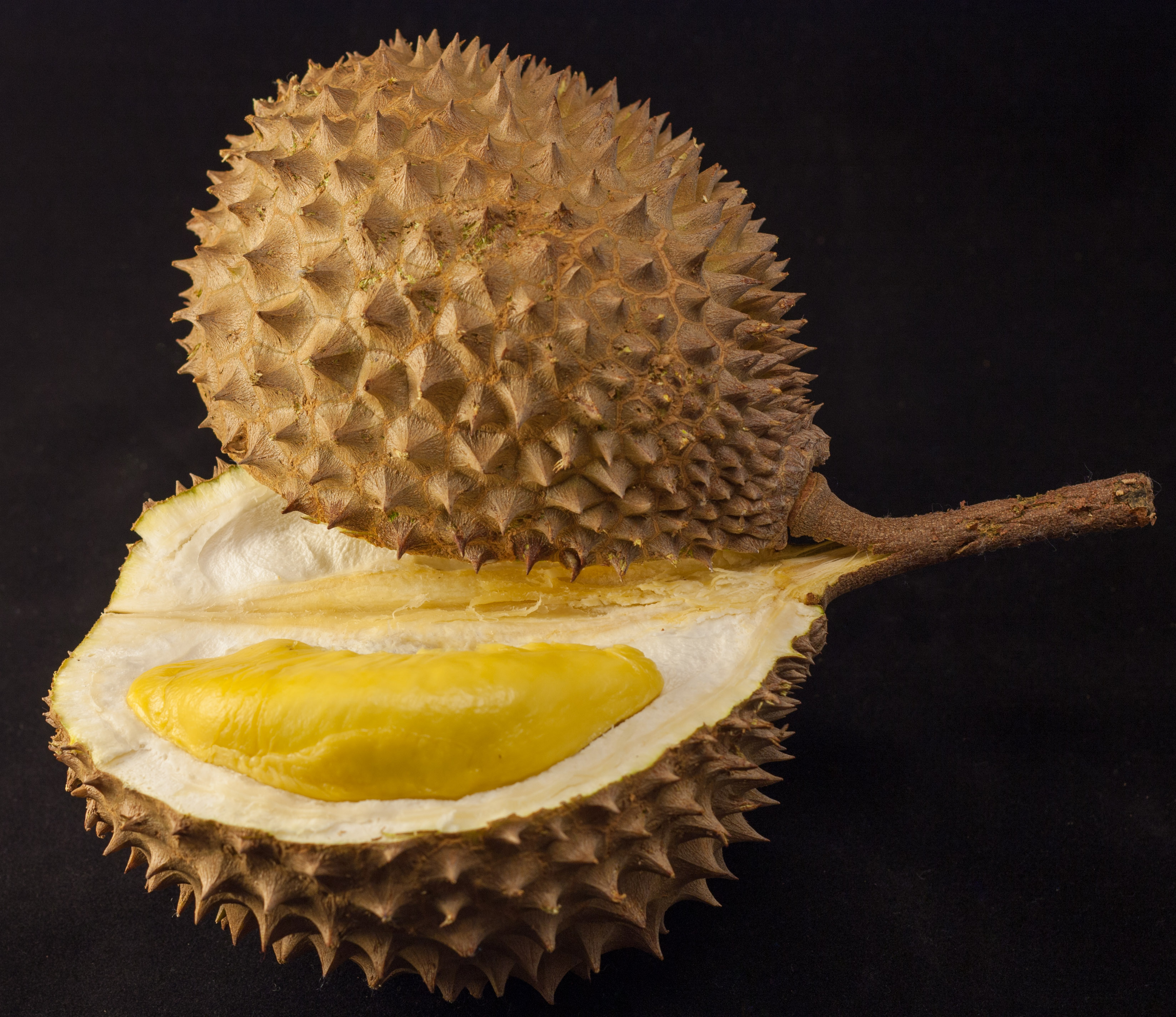
Durian (Durio zibethinus) fruit cut open to show the edible flesh

The durian (/ˈdʊəriən/) is the edible fruit of trees in the genus Durio, most often applying to those of Durio zibethinus, the only species available on the international market. Other species are sold in their local regions.

Known in some regions as the "king of fruits", the durian is distinctive for its large size, strong odour, and thorn-covered rind. The fruit can grow as large as 30 cm (12 in) long and 15 cm (6 in) in diameter, and it typically weighs 1 to 3 kg (2 to 7 lb). Its shape ranges from oblong to round, the colour of its husk from green to brown, and its flesh from pale yellow to red, depending on the species. The flavour of the flesh is complex with savoury notes. The texture is creamy and pudding-like.

From left to right: Opened fruits of Durio kutejensis, Durio oxleyanus and an orange-flesh form of Durio graveolens.

Some people regard the durian as having a pleasantly sweet fragrance, whereas many others find the aroma overpowering and unpleasant. The persistence of its strong odour, which may linger for several days, has led some hotels and public transportation services in Southeast Asia, such as in Singapore and Bangkok, to ban the fruit. The flesh can be consumed at various stages of ripeness, and it is used to flavour a wide variety of sweet desserts and savoury dishes in Southeast Asian cuisines. The seeds can be eaten when cooked.

== Etymology ==
The name durian is derived from the Malay word duri 'thorn', a reference to the numerous prickly thorns on the fruit's rind, combined with the noun-building suffix -an.

The Oxford English Dictionary first cites the word from a 1588 translation of Juan González de Mendoza's Historie of the Great and Mightie Kingdome of China. Variant spellings, largely historical, include durion, duryoen, duroyen, durean, and dorian.

The species name of the type species, Durio zibethinus, refers either to the Italian zibetto 'civet' or specifically the Indian civet, Viverra zibetha. There is disagreement over whether the name, bestowed by Carl Linnaeus, alludes to civets being fond of the durian, or whether strong pungent odour of the fruit reminded people of the smell of the animal.

== Description ==
Durian trees are large, growing to 25–50 metres (80–165 feet) in height depending on the species. The leaves are evergreen, elliptic to oblong and 10–18 centimetres (4–7 inches) long. The flowers are produced in three to thirty clusters together on large branches and directly on the trunk, with each flower having a calyx (sepals) and five (rarely four or six) petals. Durian trees have one or two flowering and fruiting periods per year, although the timing varies depending on the species, cultivars, and localities. Durian flowers are large and feathery, with copious nectar; they give off a heavy, sour, buttery odour. These features are typical of flowers pollinated by certain species of bats that eat nectar and pollen.

A typical durian tree can bear fruit after four or five years. The fruit can hang from any branch, and matures roughly three months after pollination. The fruit can grow up to 30 cm (12 in) long and 15 cm (6 in) in diameter, and typically weighs 1 to 3 kilograms (2–7 lb). Its shape ranges from oblong to round, the colour of its husk green to brown, and its flesh pale-yellow to red, depending on the species. Among the thirty known species of Durio, eight produce edible fruits: D. zibethinus, D. dulcis, D. graveolens, D. kutejensis, D. lowianus, D. macrantha, D. oxleyanus and D. testudinarius.

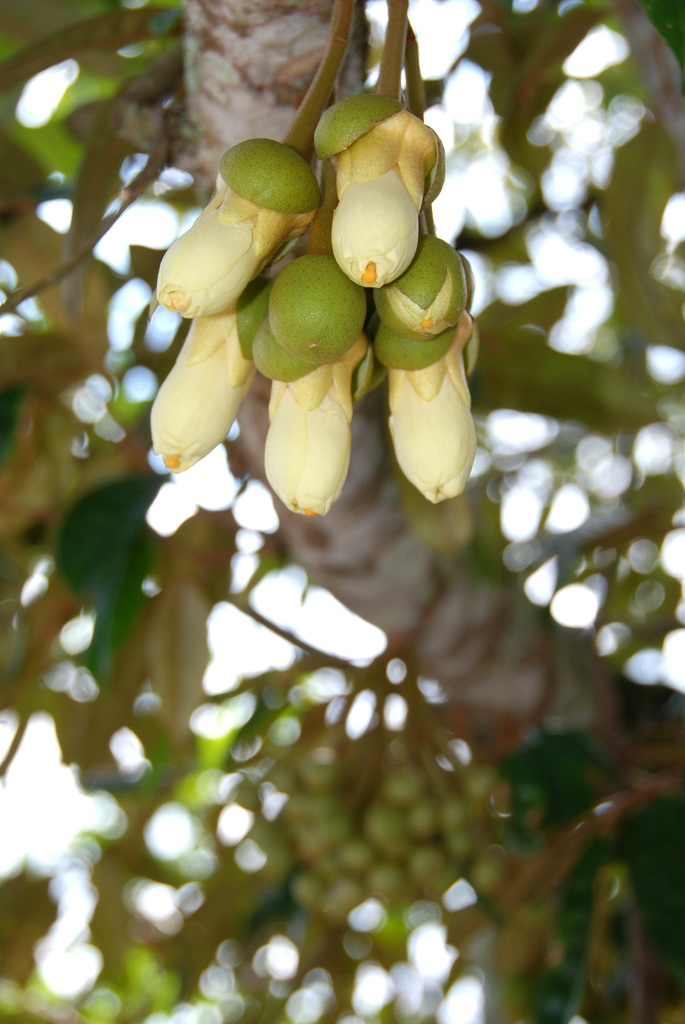
The flowers are usually closed during the daytime.

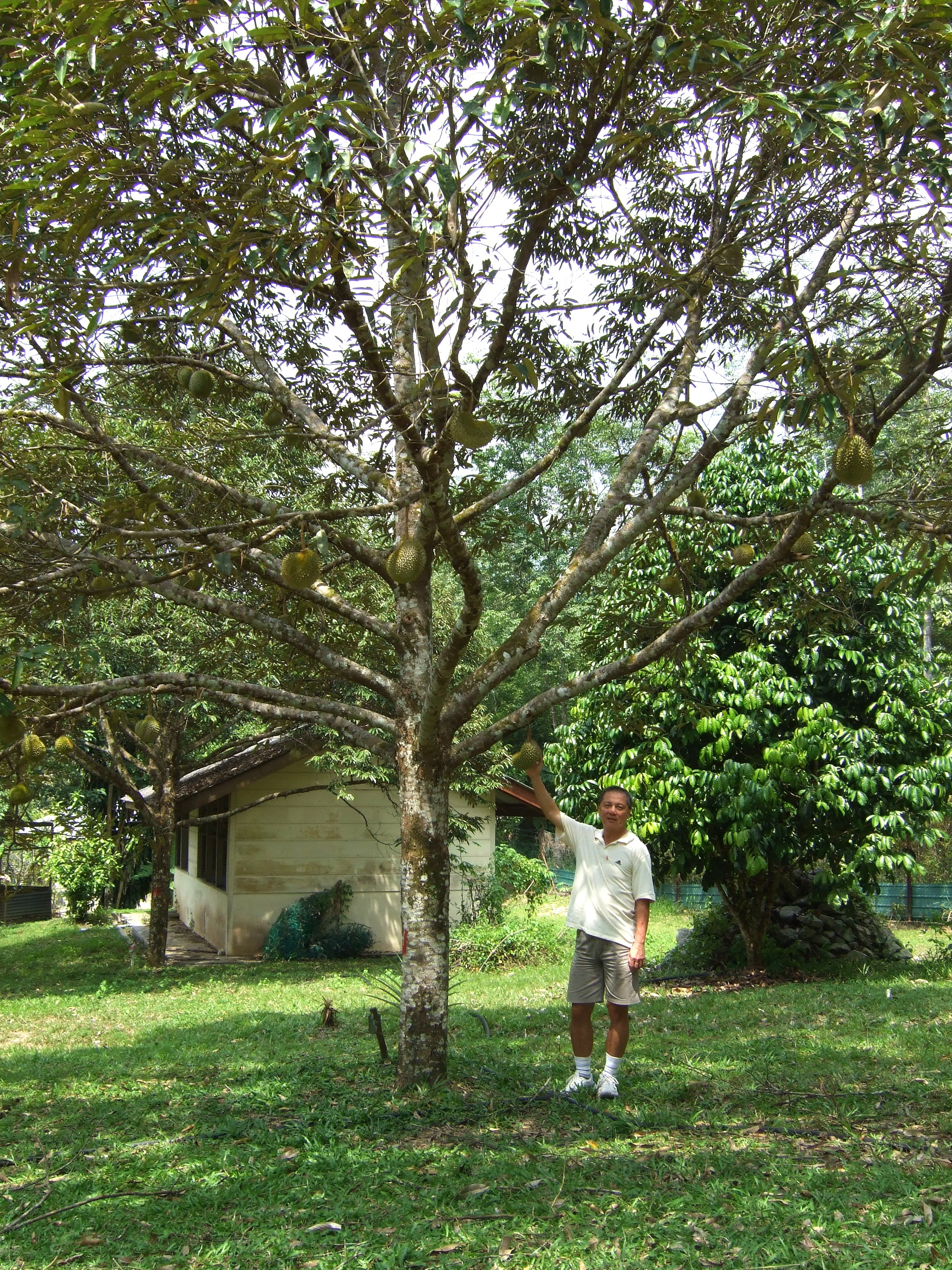
Juvenile tree, Malaysia. Mature specimens can grow up to 50 metres (160 feet).

== Ecology ==
Durians can be pollinated by bats (the cave nectar bat Eonycteris spelaea, the lesser short-nosed fruit bat Cynopterus brachyotis, and the large flying fox, Pteropus vampyrus). Two species, D. grandiflorus and D. oblongus, are pollinated by spiderhunter birds (Nectariniidae), while D. kutejensis is pollinated by giant honey bees and birds as well as by bats. Some scientists have hypothesised that the development of monothecate anthers and larger flowers (compared with those of the remaining genera in Durioneae) in the clade consisting of Durio, Boschia, and Cullenia was in conjunction with a transition from beetle pollination to vertebrate pollination.

=== Environmental impact ===
The high demand for durians in China has prompted a shift in Malaysia from small-scale durian orchards to large-scale industrial operations. Forests are cleared to make way for large durian plantations, compounding an existing deforestation problem caused by the cultivation of oil palms. Animal species such as the small flying fox, which pollinates durian trees, and the Malayan tiger are endangered by the increasing deforestation of their habitats. In the Gua Musang District, the state government approved the conversion of 40 km^{2} (10,000 acres) of forestry, including indigenous lands of the Orang Asli, to durian plantations.

The prevalence of the Musang King and Monthong varieties in Malaysia and Thailand, respectively, has led to concerns about a decrease in the durian's genetic diversity at the expense of higher-quality varieties. A 2022 study of durian species in Kalimantan, Indonesia, found low genetic diversity, suggestive of inbreeding depression and genetic drift. Additionally, these dominant hybrid varieties are more susceptible to pests and fungal diseases, requiring the use of insecticides and fungicides that can weaken the trees.

== Origin and history ==
The origin of the durian is thought to be in the region of Borneo and Sumatra, with wild trees in the Malay Peninsula and orchards commonly cultivated in a wide region from India to New Guinea. Four hundred years ago, it was traded across present-day Myanmar and was actively cultivated especially in Thailand and South Vietnam.

The earliest known European reference to the durian is the record of Niccolò de' Conti, who travelled to Southeast Asia in the 15th century. Translated from the Latin in which Poggio Bracciolini recorded de Conti's travels: "They [people of Sumatra] have a green fruit which they call durian, as big as a watermelon. Inside there are five things like elongated oranges, and resembling thick butter, with a combination of flavours." The Portuguese physician Garcia de Orta described durians in Colóquios dos simples e drogas da India published in 1563. In 1741, Herbarium Amboinense by the German botanist Georg Eberhard Rumphius was published, providing the most detailed and accurate account of durians for over a century. The genus Durio has a complex taxonomy that has seen the subtraction and addition of many species since it was created by Rumphius. During the early stages of its taxonomical study, there was some confusion between durian and the soursop (Annona muricata), for both of these species had thorny green fruit. The Malay name for the soursop is durian Belanda, meaning Dutch durian. In the 18th century, Johann Anton Weinmann considered the durian to belong to Castaneae as its fruit was similar to the horse chestnut.

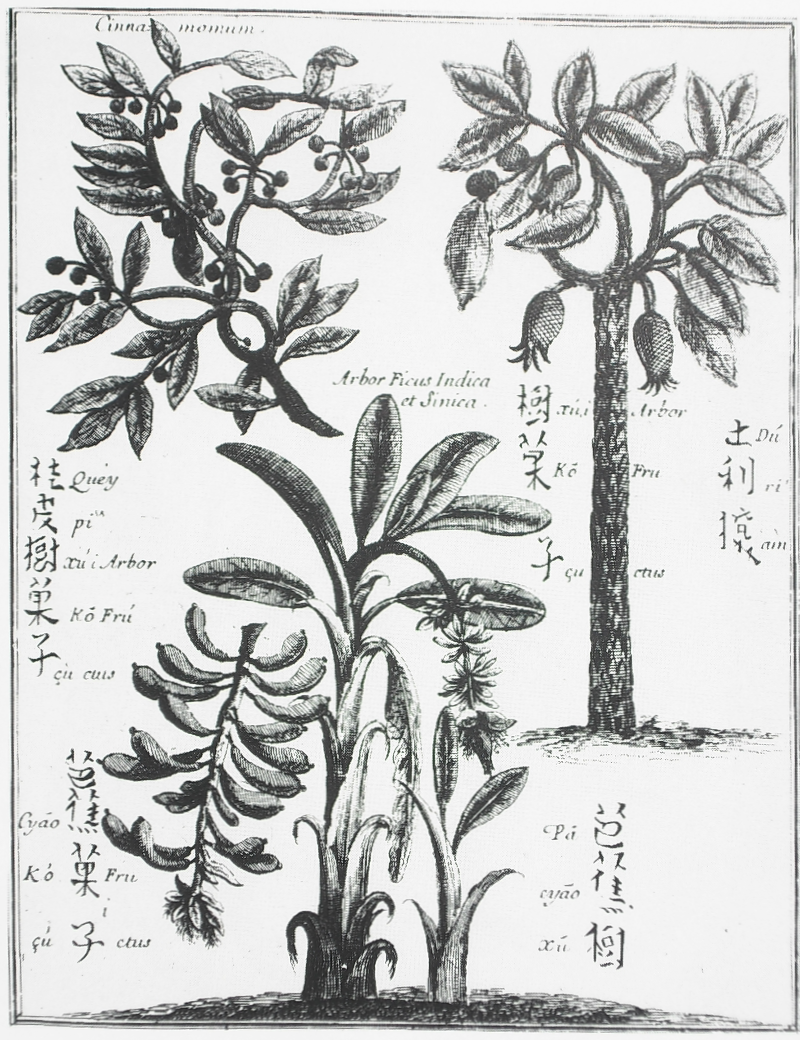
A plate from Michał Boym's 1655 account of China, showing cinnamon, durian, and plantain

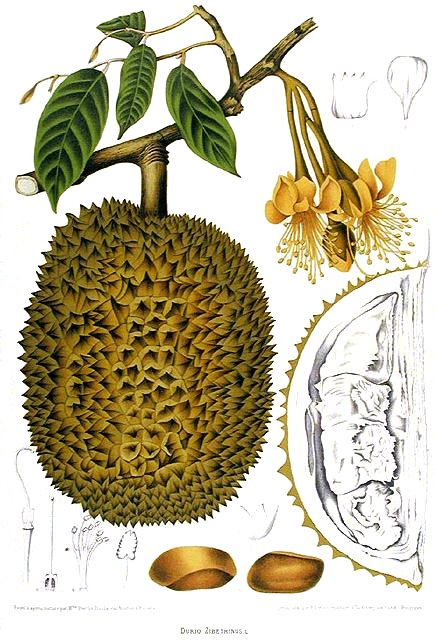
Durio zibethinus. Chromolithograph by Hoola Van Nooten, circa 1863

D. zibethinus was introduced into Ceylon by the Portuguese in the 16th century and was reintroduced many times later. It has been planted in the Americas but confined to botanical gardens. The first seedlings were sent from the Royal Botanic Gardens, Kew, to Auguste Saint-Arroman of Dominica in 1884.

In Southeast Asia, the durian has been cultivated for centuries at the village level, probably since the late 18th century, and commercially since the mid-20th century. In My Tropic Isle, Australian author and naturalist Edmund James Banfield tells how, in the early 20th century, a friend in Singapore sent him a durian seed, which he planted and cared for on his tropical island off the north coast of Queensland.

In 1949, the British botanist E. J. H. Corner published The Durian Theory, or the Origin of the Modern Tree. This proposed that endozoochory (the enticement of animals to transport seeds in their stomach) arose before any other method of seed dispersal and that primitive ancestors of Durio species were the earliest practitioners of that dispersal method, in particular red durian (D. dulcis) exemplifying the primitive fruit of flowering plants. However, in more recent circumscriptions of Durioneae, the tribe into which Durio and its sister taxa fall, fleshy arils and spiny fruits are derived within the clade. Some genera possess these characters, but others do not. The most recent molecular evidence (on which the most recent, well-supported circumscription of Durioneae is based) therefore refutes Corner's Durian Theory.

Since the early 1990s, the domestic and international demand for durian in the Association of Southeast Asian Nations (ASEAN) region has increased significantly. In the early 2020s, a durian craze in China led to a large increase in international trade of the fruit.

=== Cultivars ===
Over the centuries, numerous durian cultivars, propagated by vegetative clones, have arisen in Southeast Asia. They used to be grown, with mixed results, from seeds of trees bearing superior quality fruit. They are now propagated by layering, marcotting, or more commonly, grafting, including bud, veneer, wedge, whip and U-grafting, onto seedlings of randomly selected rootstocks. Different cultivars may be distinguished to some extent by variations in the fruit shape, such as the shape of the spines.

==== Malaysian varieties ====
The Malaysian Ministry of Agriculture and Agro-Based Industry has since 1934 maintained a list of registered varieties, where each cultivar is assigned a common name and a code number starting with "D". These codes are widely used through Southeast Asia; as of 2021, there were over 200 registered varieties. Many superior cultivars have been identified through competitions held at the annual Malaysian Agriculture, Horticulture, and Agrotourism Show. There are 13 common Malaysian varieties having favourable qualities of colour, texture, odour, taste, high yield, and resistance against various diseases.

'Musang King' ('D197') was discovered in the 1980s, when a man named Tan Lai Fook from Raub, Pahang, stumbled upon a durian tree in Gua Musang, Kelantan. He brought a branch back to Raub for grafting. The cultivar was named after its place of origin. The variety has bright yellow flesh and is like a more potent or enhanced version of the 'D24'. The D24 or Sultan durian has golden yellow flesh and a rich texture and aroma. It is a popular variety in Malaysia.

Other popular cultivars in Malaysia include 'Tekka', with a distinctive yellowish core in the inner stem; 'D168' (IOI), which is round, of medium size, green and yellow outer skin, and easily dislodged flesh which is medium-thick, solid, yellow in colour, and sweet; and 'Red Prawn' (Udang Merah, 'D175'), found in the states of Pahang and Johor. The fruit is medium-sized, oval, brownish green, with short thorns. The flesh is thick, not solid, yellow-coloured, and has a sweet taste.

Malaysian varieties

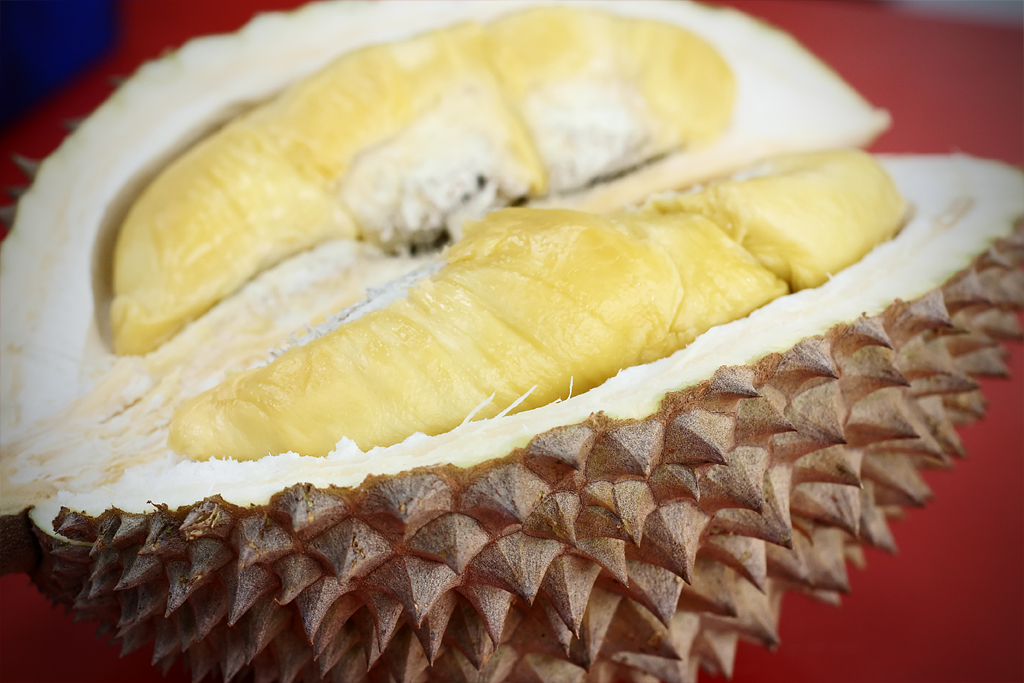
'Musang King', the most popular variety in Malaysia

==== Indonesian varieties ====
Indonesia has more than 100 varieties of durian. The most cultivated species is D. zibethinus. Notable varieties are Bawor (Banyumas), Sukun (Central Java), Sitokong (Betawi), Sijapang (Betawi), Simas (Bogor), Sunan (Jepara), Si dodol and Si hijau (South Kalimantan), and Petruk (Central Java).

Indonesian varieties

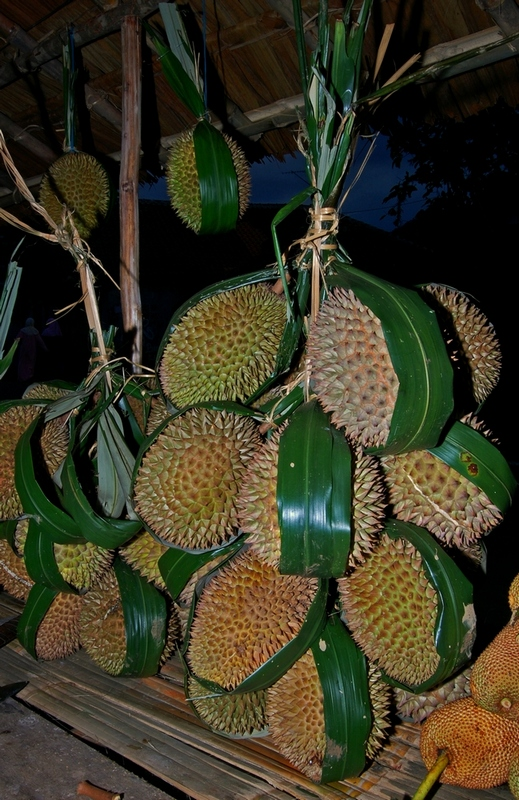
Local cultivar in Cigudeg, Bogor, West Java

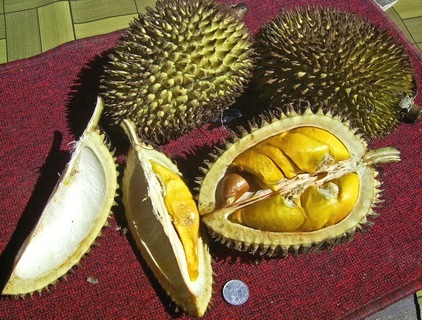
Durio kutejensis, popular in Kalimantan

==== Thai varieties ====
In Thailand, 'Mon Thong' is the most commercially sought after cultivar, for its thick, full-bodied creamy and mild sweet-tasting flesh with moderate smell and smaller seeds, while 'Chanee' is most resistant to infection by Phytophthora palmivora. 'Kan Yao' is less common, but prized for its longer window of time when it is both sweet and odourless. Among the cultivars in Thailand, five are currently in large-scale commercial cultivation: 'Chanee', 'Mon Thong', 'Kan Yao', 'Ruang', and 'Kradum'.

By 2007, Thai government scientist Songpol Somsri had crossbred more than ninety varieties of durian to create 'Chantaburi No. 1', a cultivar without the characteristic odour. Another hybrid, Chantaburi No. 3, develops the odour about three days after the fruit is picked, which enables an odourless transport yet satisfies consumers who prefer the pungent odour. In 2012, two odourless cultivars, 'Long Laplae' and 'Lin Laplae', were presented to the public by Yothin Samutkhiri, governor of Thailand's Uttaradit province where they were developed.

==== Philippine varieties ====
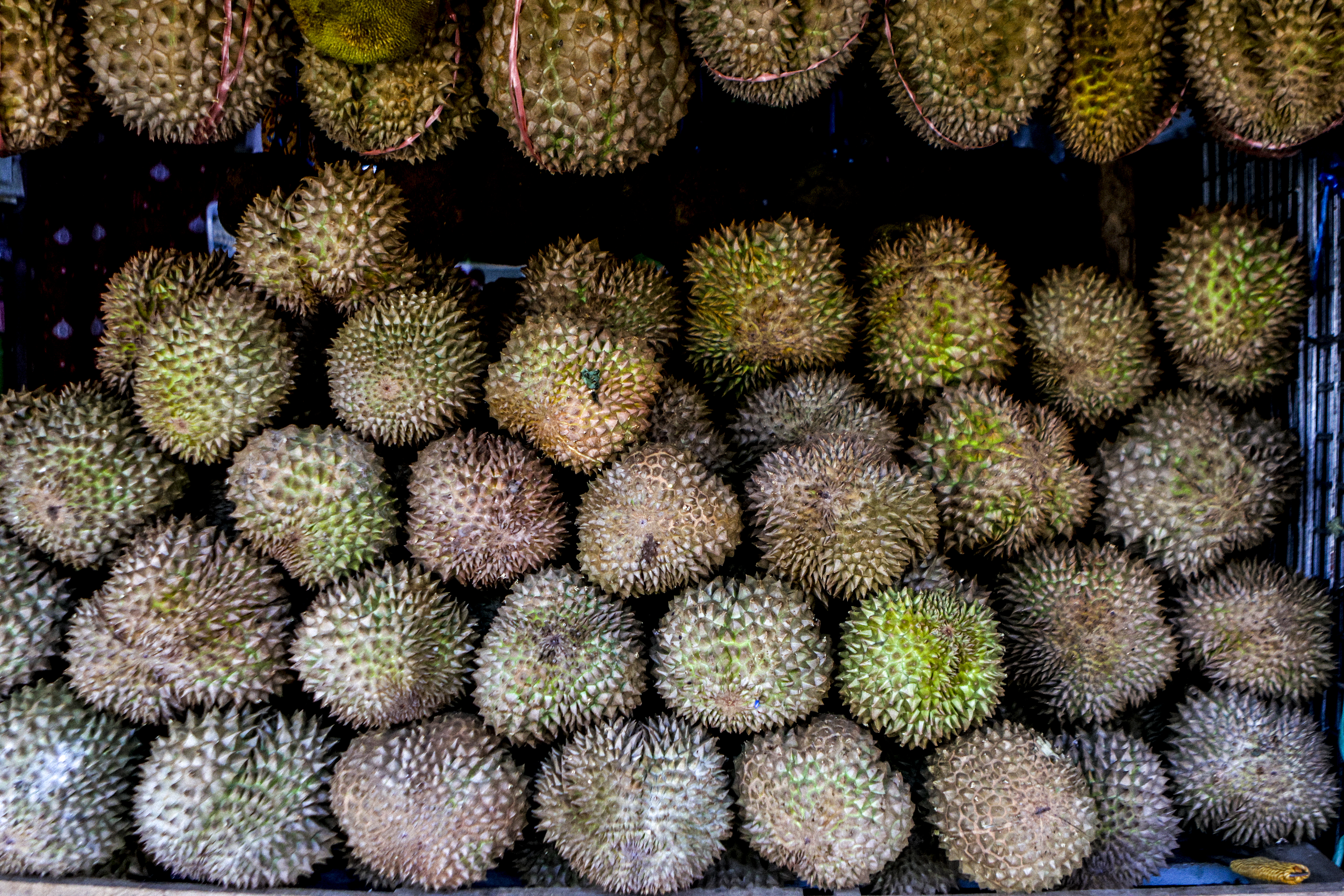
Durians for sale in Magsaysay Park, Davao City, Philippines

Uncultivated durian trees found in Mindanao are known as "native" varieties. They have large seeds and thin flesh that is white or yellow. They are strong-tasting and generally more expensive than hybrids due to their rarity.

The two most popular cultivars in the Philippines are 'Arancillo' ('ACC.1497') and 'Puyat', both are hybrids descended from native durians and the 'Chanee' cultivar of Thailand. Other Philippine cultivars include 'Alcon Fancy', 'Duyaya', 'Umali', 'UPLB Gold', 'Atabrine' ('DES806'), 'DES1545', 'Kimbangan', 'Lacson 1' and 'Lacson 2', 'Malagkit', 'S7', 'S1', 'Mamer' ('DES916', a native variety from Calinan), and 'Galang Durian 69'.

Thornless cultivars of durian are being developed in the Philippines, after wild genetic mutations were discovered in Davao de Oro. However, these varieties remain unpopular because they are inferior in taste to other cultivars.

Durio graveolens, a durian species native to the Philippines, is known under different local names based on the flesh color: dugyan (red), manakuka (orange), and luod (white). Luod is often regarded as sweeter and superior in taste to Durio zibethinus, but they are not commercially cultivated due to their small sizes.

== Cultivation and trade ==
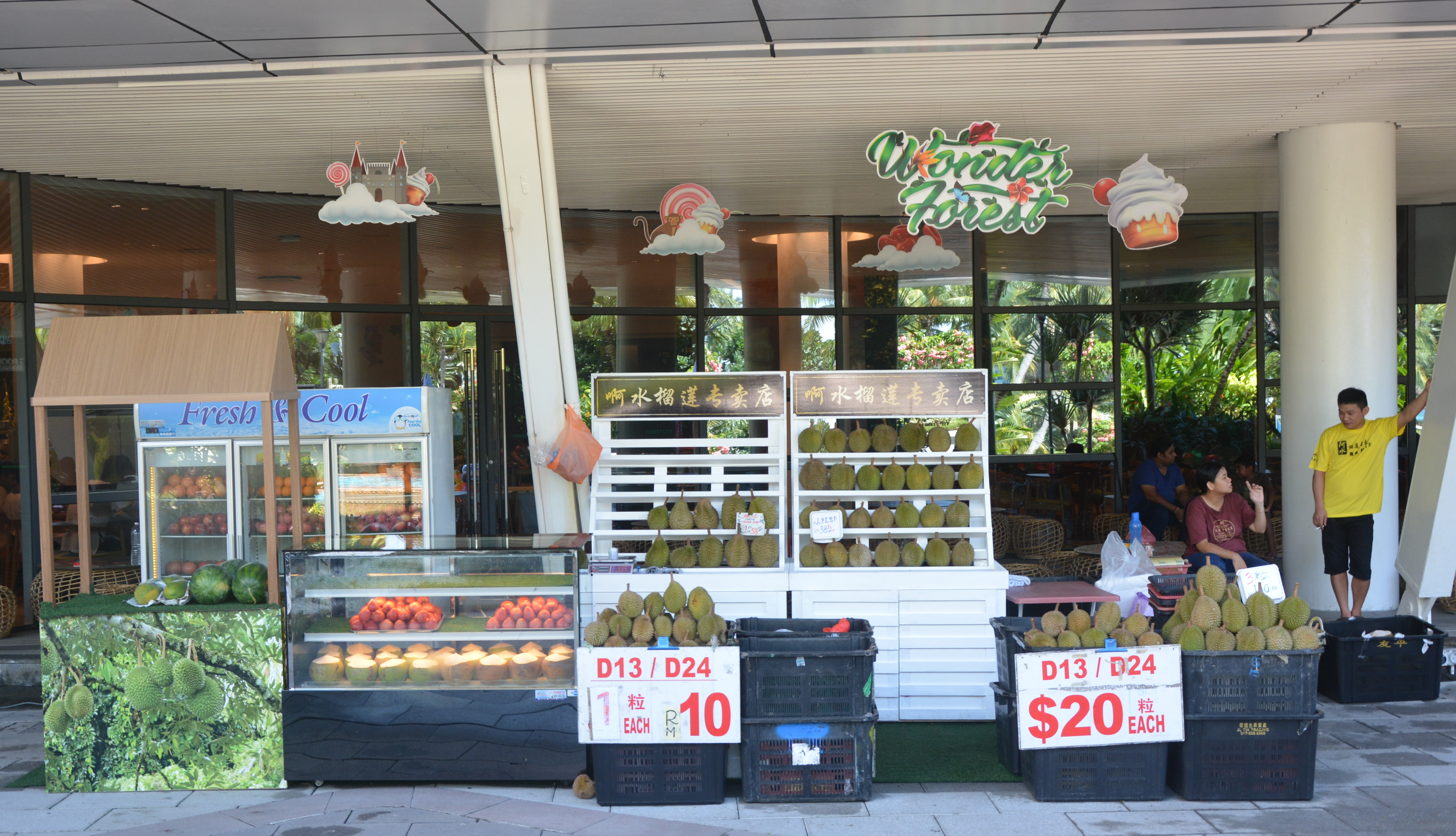
A durian vendor in Malaysia

D. zibethinus is the only species commercially cultivated on a large scale and available outside its native region.

In 2018, Thailand was ranked the world's number one exporter of durians, producing around 700,000 tonnes of durians per year, 400,000 tonnes of which are exported to mainland China and Hong Kong. Chantaburi in Thailand holds the World Durian Festival in early May each year. This single province is responsible for half of the durian production of Thailand. The Davao Region is the top producer of the fruit in the Philippines, producing 60% of the country's total.

In Brunei, consumers prefer D. graveolens, D. kutejensis, and D. oxleyanus. These species constitute a genetically diverse crop source.

The durian was introduced into Australia in the early 1960s, and clonal material followed in 1975. Over thirty clones of D. zibethinus and six other Durio species have been subsequently introduced into Australia. The durian was introduced to the Hawaiian islands through a gift by Chulalongkorn to King Kalākaua while the latter stopped by Bangkok during his 1881 world diplomatic tour.

In 2019 the value of imported fresh durians became the highest of all fresh fruits imported to China, surpassing cherries. In 2021, China purchased at least US$3.4 billion worth or 90 percent of Thailand's fresh durian exports in that year. Overall Chinese imports grew to $4 billion in 2022, when the Philippines and Vietnam gained permission to export fresh durians to China, and $6.7 billion in 2023 when 1.4 million tonnes were imported. The durian has become a status symbol indicating wealth. Durians from Thailand retail at around ¥150 (US$20), while the more prestigious Musang King variety retails at around ¥500 and can be a birthday or wedding gift. The potential value for exporters has allowed China to leverage durians as part of trade talks. The entire export of durians from Southeast Asia to China increased from US$550 million in 2017, to US$6.7 billion in 2023. China's largest imports of the fruit came from Thailand, followed by Malaysia and Vietnam.

The durian is a relatively costly fruit because of its short shelf life. Shelf life can be extended to around 4 to 5 weeks by shrink wrapping each fruit. This inhibits dehiscence, probably by multiple mechanisms: inhibiting respiration; reducing loss of water; holding the fruit's parts together; and reducing decomposition by microbes. The edible portion of the fruit, known as the aril and usually called the 'flesh' or 'pulp', only accounts for about 15–30% of the mass of the entire fruit.

== Flavour and odour ==
=== Perception ===
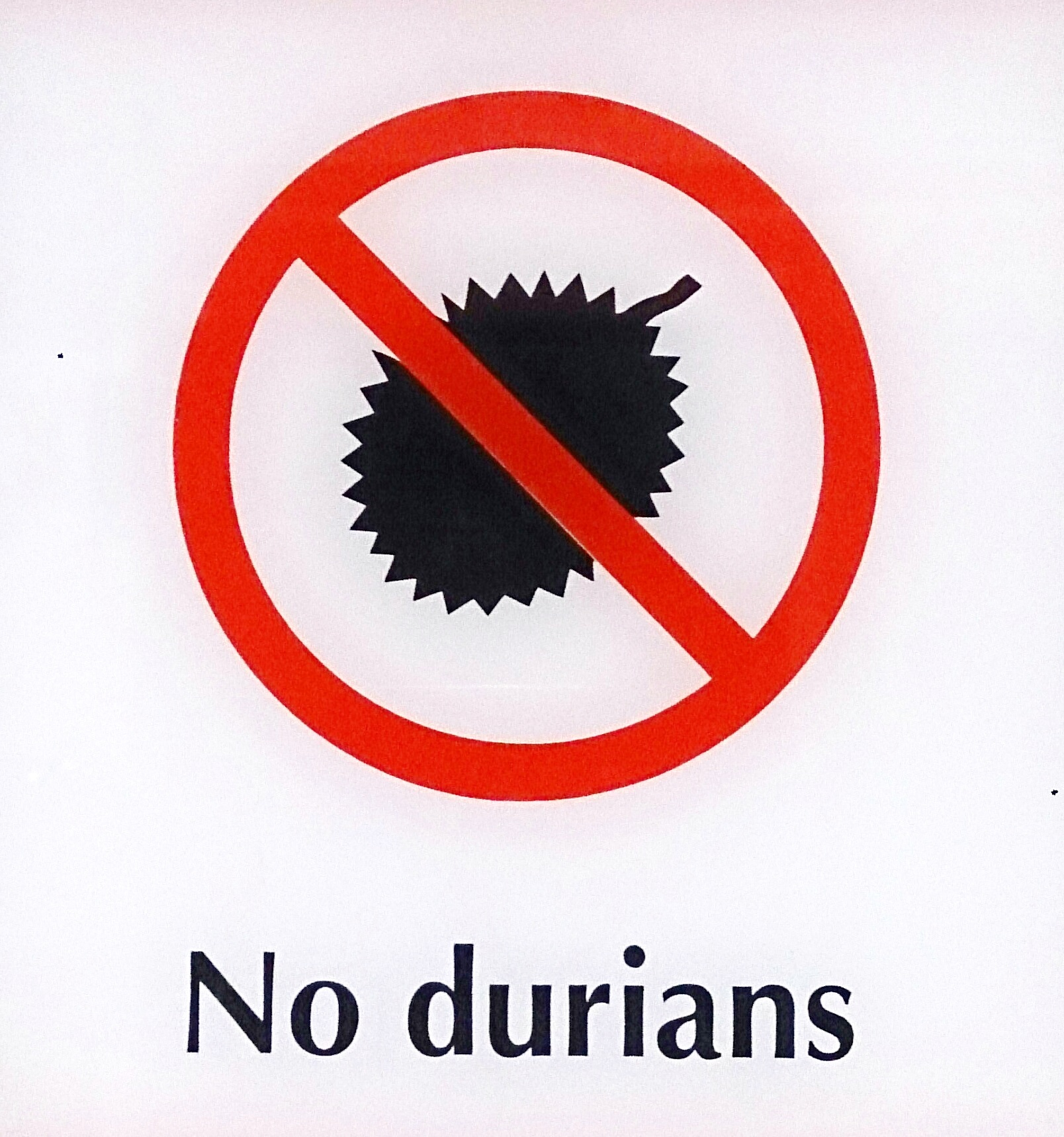
Sign forbidding durians in Singapore's Mass Rapid Transit

The strong flavour and odour of the fruit have prompted views ranging from appreciation to disgust. The fruit's strong smell has led to its ban from public transport systems in Singapore and in Bangkok.

Writing in 1856, the British naturalist Alfred Russel Wallace called the fruit's consistency and flavour "indescribable. A rich custard highly flavoured with almonds gives the best general idea of it, but there are occasional wafts of flavour that call to mind cream-cheese, onion-sauce, sherry-wine, and other incongruous dishes. Then there is a rich glutinous smoothness in the pulp which nothing else possesses, but which adds to its delicacy." He concluded that it provided a "new sensation worth a voyage to the East to experience. ... as producing a food of the most exquisite flavour it is unsurpassed." Wallace described himself as being at first reluctant to try it because of the aroma, but on eating one in Borneo "out of doors, I at once became a confirmed Durian eater". He cites another writer as stating: "To those not used to it, it seems at first to smell like rotten onions, but immediately after they have tasted it they prefer it to all other food. The natives give it honourable titles, exalt it, and make verses on it."

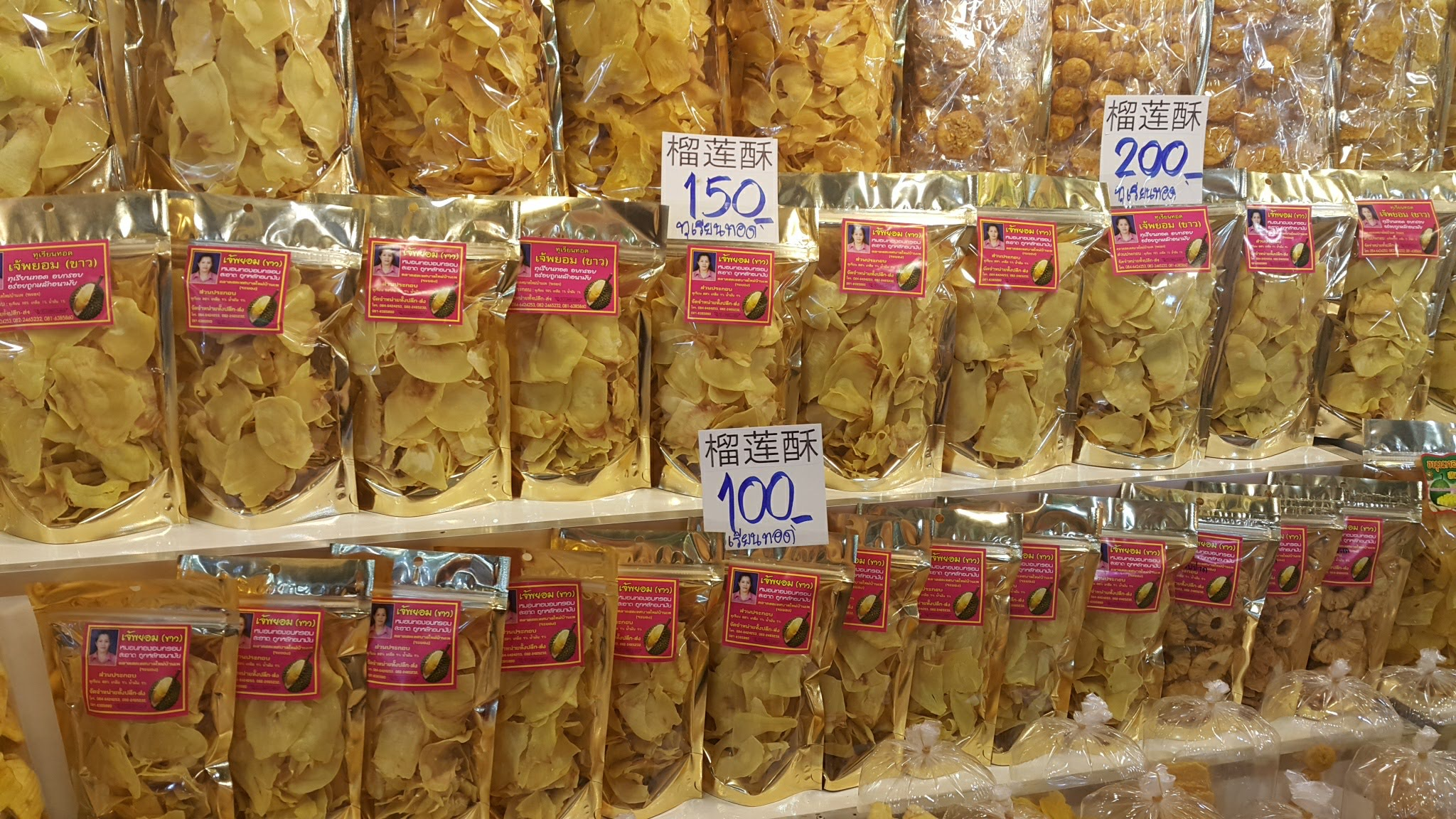
Sliced deep-fried durian in packages at a market in Thailand

The novelist Anthony Burgess wrote that eating durian is "like eating sweet raspberry blancmange in the lavatory". The travel and food writer Richard Sterling states that "its odor is best described as pig-excrement, turpentine and onions, garnished with a gym sock." Other comparisons have been made with the civet, sewage, stale vomit, skunk spray and used surgical swabs. Such descriptions may reflect the odour's variability. Different species and cultivars vary markedly in aroma; for example, red durian (D. dulcis) has a deep caramel flavour with a turpentine odour while red-fleshed durian (D. graveolens) emits a fragrance of roasted almonds.

=== Biochemistry ===
Hundreds of phytochemicals are responsible for durian flavour and aroma. They include diverse volatile compounds, such as esters, ketones, alcohols (primarily ethanol), and organosulfur compounds. Ethyl 2-methylbutanoate had the highest content among esters in a study of several varieties. Sugar content, primarily sucrose, has a range of 8–20% among different durian varieties. Durian flesh contains diverse polyphenols, especially myricetin, and various carotenoids, including a rich content of beta-carotene.

People in Southeast Asia with frequent exposures to durian are able to easily distinguish the sweet-like scent of its ketones and esters from rotten or putrescine odours which are from volatile amines and fatty acids. Some individuals are unable to differentiate these smells and find this fruit noxious, whereas others find it pleasant and appealing.

This strong odour can be detected half a mile away by animals, thus luring them. In addition, the fruit is highly appetising to diverse animals, including black hornbills, squirrels, mouse deer, wild boars, sun bears, viverrids, orangutans, elephants, crab-eating macaques, and even carnivorous tigers. While some of these animals swallow the seed with the fruit and then transport it some distance before excreting, thus dispersing the seed, the thorny, armoured covering of the fruit discourages smaller animals; larger animals are more likely to transport the seeds far from the parent tree.

==== Sulfur components ====
The odour of durian is strongly influenced by the presence of organosulfur compounds. According to headspace gas chromatography analysis, durian emits diethyltrisulfide, diethyldisulfide, dithiolane, dimethyl sulfide, and 3-methylthiazolidine.

Among the ca. 46,000 coding and non-coding genes in durian are those for methionine gamma-lyases, which regulate the release of methanethiol and ethanethiol, which contribute to the fetid odour of this fruit.

=== Ripeness and selection ===
According to Larousse Gastronomique, the durian fruit is ready to eat when its husk begins to crack. However, the ideal stage of ripeness to be enjoyed varies from region to region in Southeast Asia and by species. Some species grow so tall that they can only be collected once they have fallen to the ground, whereas most cultivars of D. zibethinus are nearly always cut from the tree and allowed to ripen while waiting to be sold. Some people in southern Thailand prefer their durians relatively young, when the clusters of fruit within the shell are still crisp in texture and mild in flavour. For some people in northern Thailand, the preference is for the fruit to be soft and aromatic. In Malaysia and Singapore, most consumers prefer the fruit to be as ripe and pungent in aroma as possible and may even risk allowing the fruit to continue ripening after its husk has already cracked open. In this state, the flesh becomes richly creamy and slightly alcoholic.

The various preferences regarding ripeness among consumers make it hard to issue general statements about choosing a "good" durian. A durian that falls off the tree continues to ripen for two to four days, but after five or six days most would consider it overripe and unpalatable. All the same, some Thais cook such overripe fruit with palm sugar, creating a dessert called durian (or thurian) guan.

== Uses ==
=== Culinary ===
In Thailand, durians are eaten fresh with sweet sticky rice, and blocks of durian paste are sold in the markets, though much of the paste has pumpkin as an adulterant. Unripe durians are cooked as a vegetable, except in the Philippines, where all uses are sweet rather than savoury. Malaysians make both sugared and salted preserves from durian. When durian is minced with salt, onions and vinegar, it is called boder. In Kelantan of Malaysia's Peninsular East Coast, fermented durian flesh or tempoyak is mixed with onion and chilli slices, lime juice and an anchovy-based sauce called budu, this mix is eaten as a condiment with rice-based meals. The seeds, which are the size of chestnuts, can be eaten boiled, roasted or fried in coconut oil, with a texture that is similar to taro or yam, but stickier. In Java, the seeds are sliced thin and cooked with sugar as a confection. Uncooked seeds are potentially toxic due to cyclopropene fatty acids.

Savoury dishes

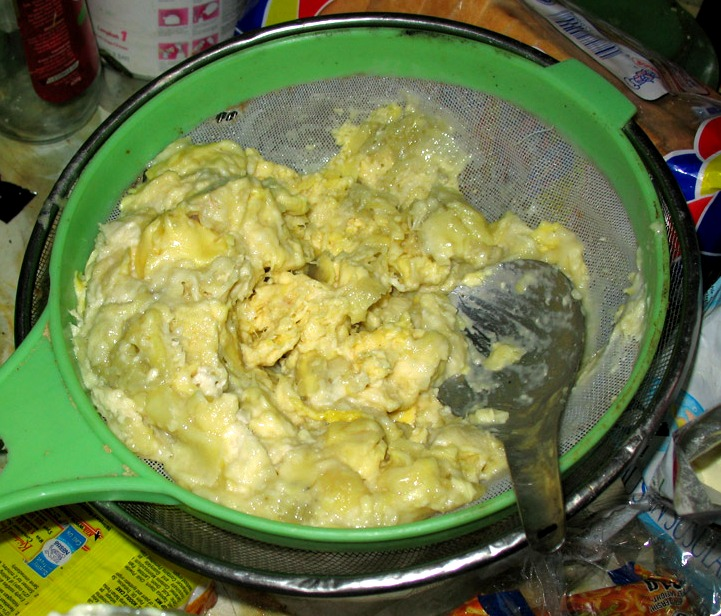
Tempoyak, made from fermented durian, Bandung, West Java

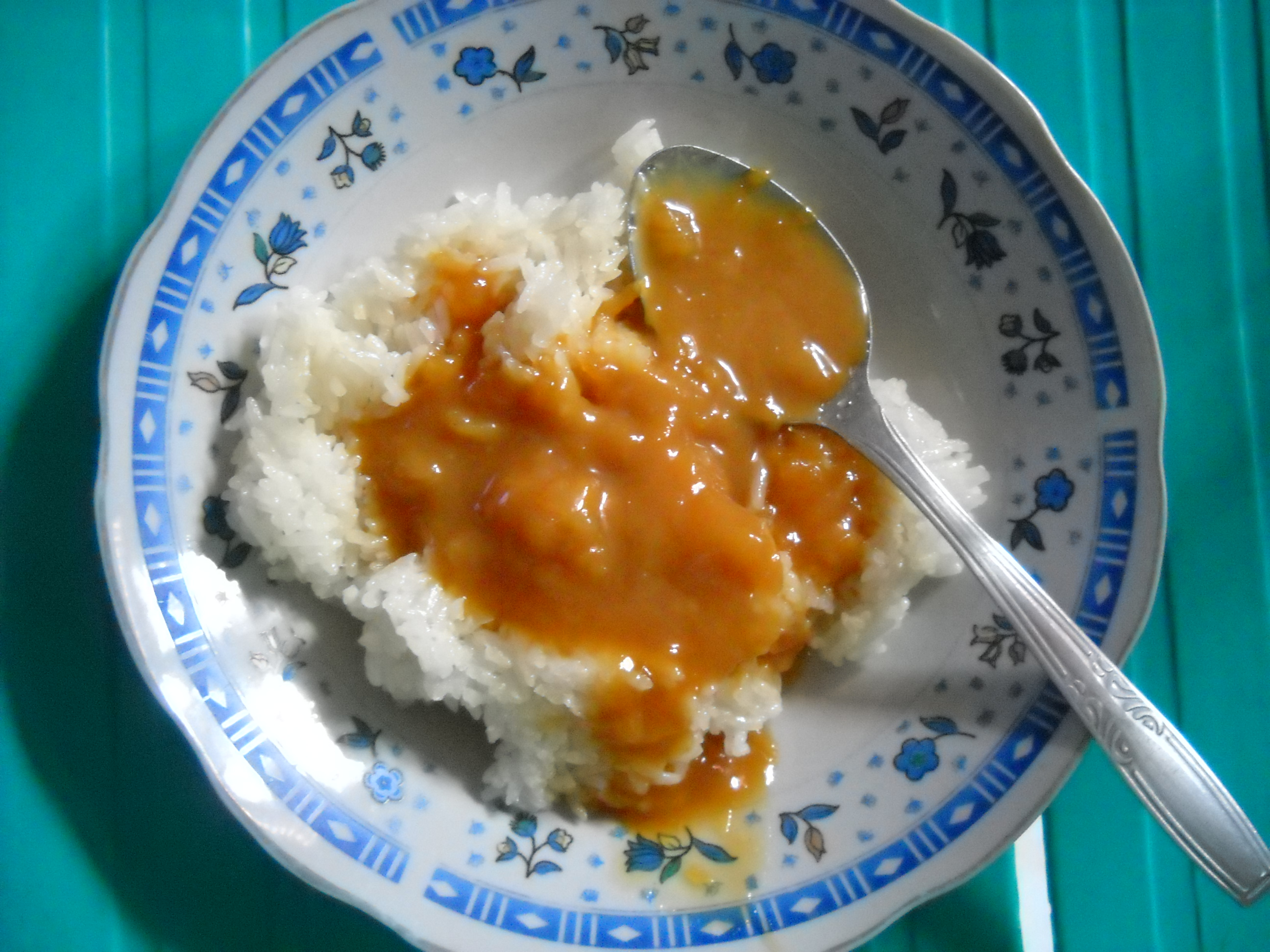
Ketan durian, glutinous rice with durian sauce, Indonesia

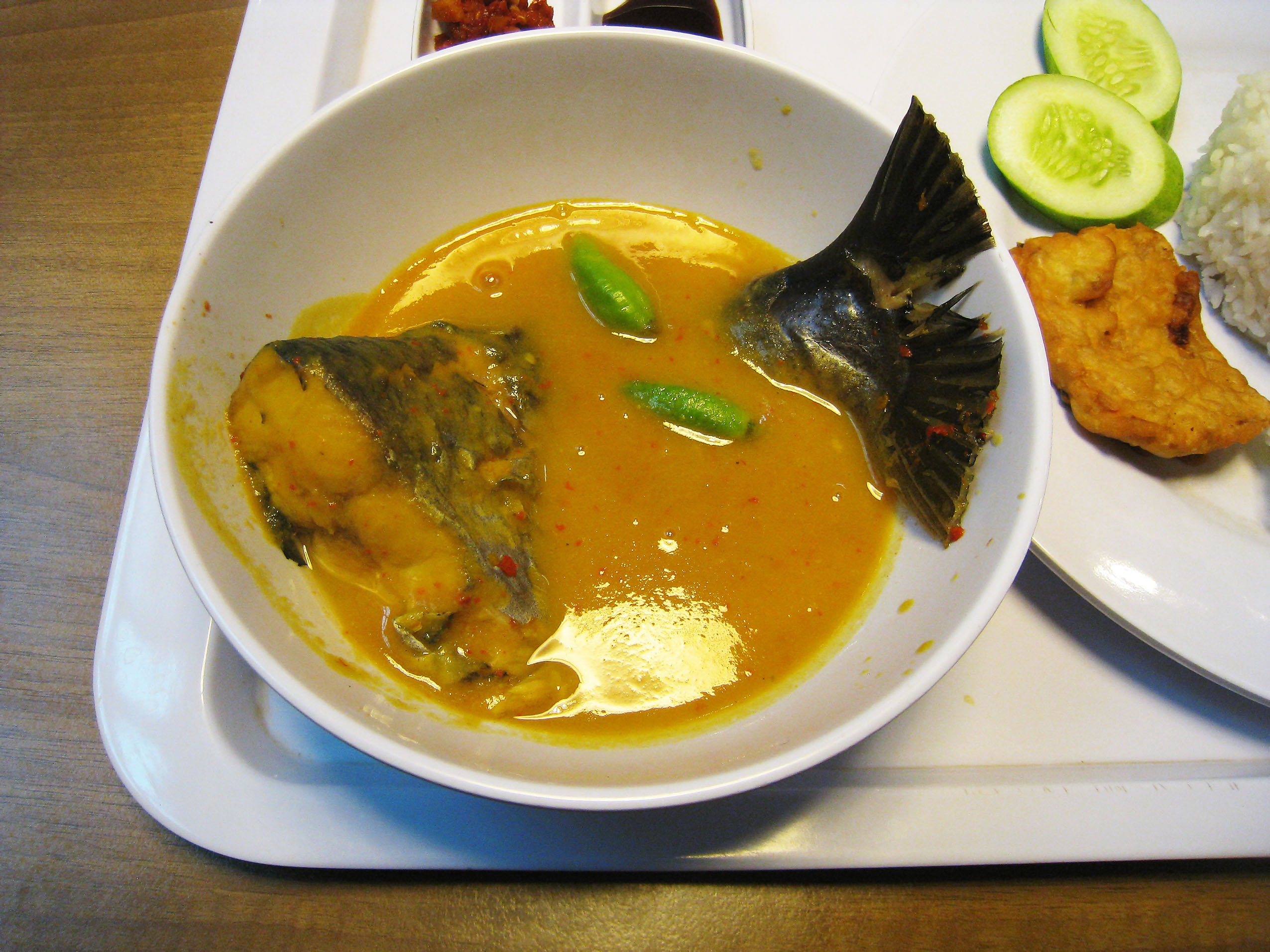
Tempoyak ikan patin, catfish in tempoyak curry, Palembang, South Sumatra

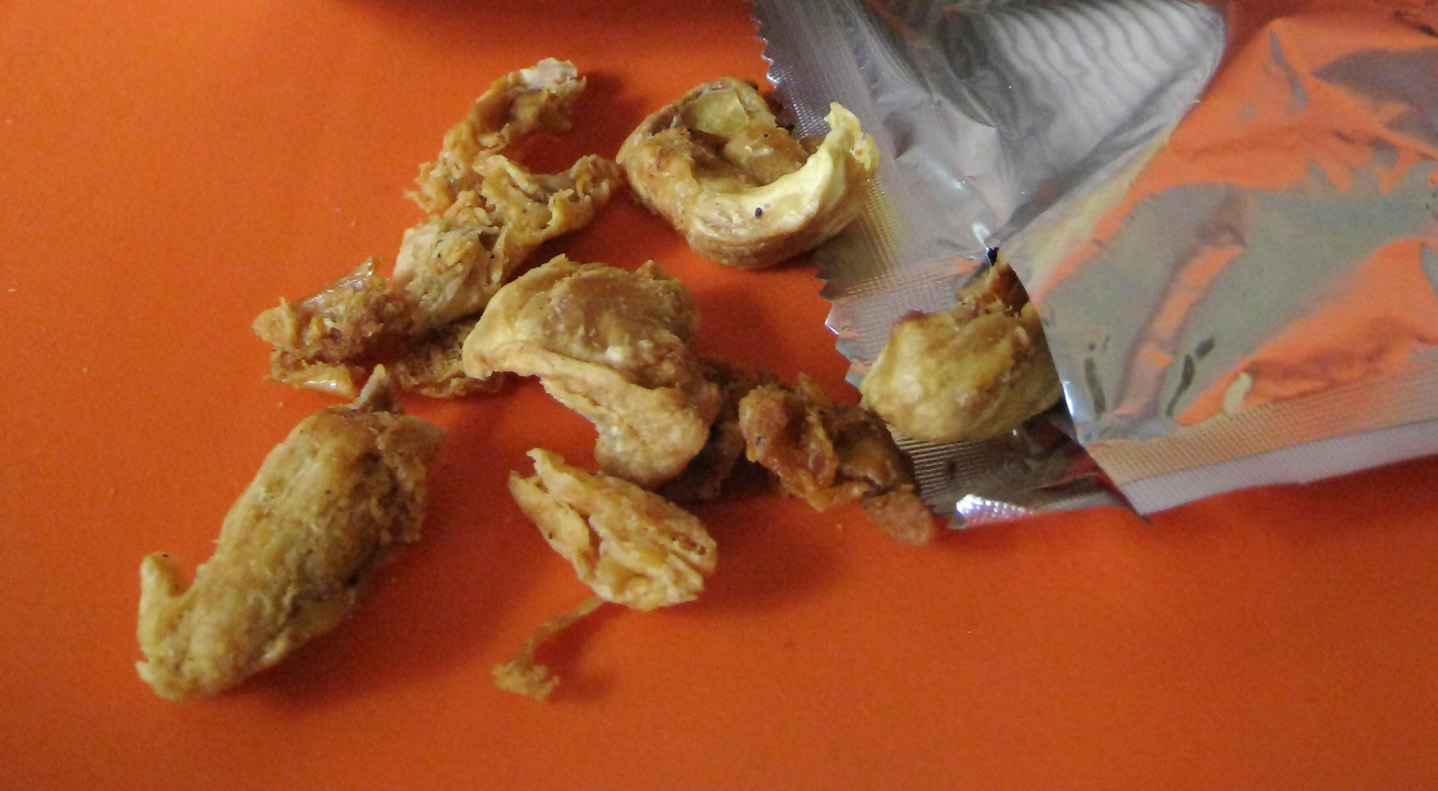
Keripik durian Medan (durian chips) in Medan, North Sumatra

Durian fruit is used to flavour a wide variety of sweet edibles such as traditional Malay candy, ice kacang, dodol, lempuk, rose biscuits, ice cream, milkshakes, mooncakes, Yule logs, and cappuccino. Es durian (durian ice cream) is a popular dessert in Indonesia, sold at streetside stalls in Indonesian cities, especially in Java. Pulut durian or ketan durian is glutinous rice steamed with coconut milk and served with ripened durian. In Sabah, red durian is fried with onions and chilli and served as a side dish. Red-fleshed durian is traditionally added to sayur, an Indonesian soup made from freshwater fish. Ikan brengkes tempoyak is fish cooked in a durian-based sauce, traditional in Sumatra.

Breads and sweets

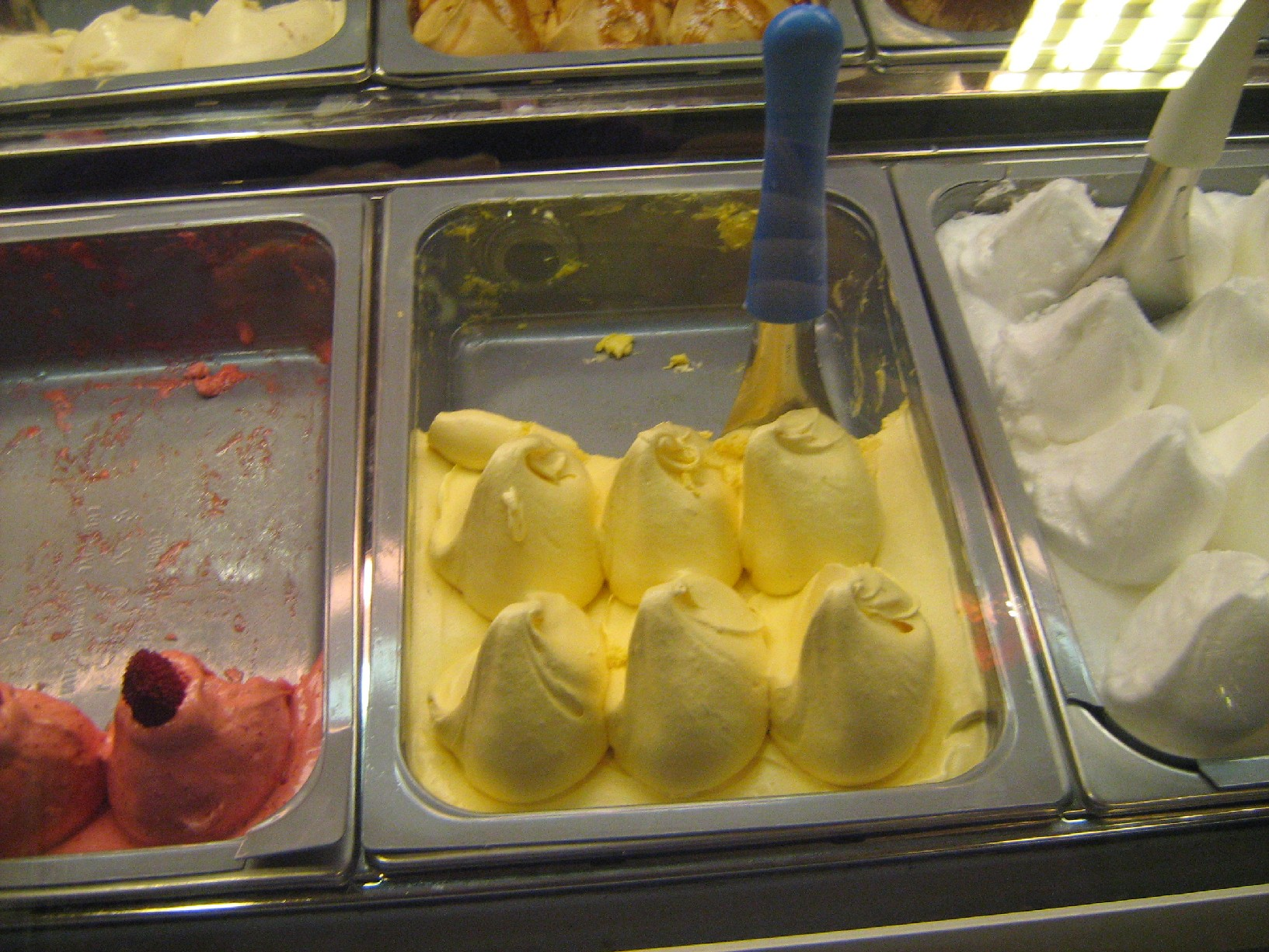
Durian ice cream in Singapore

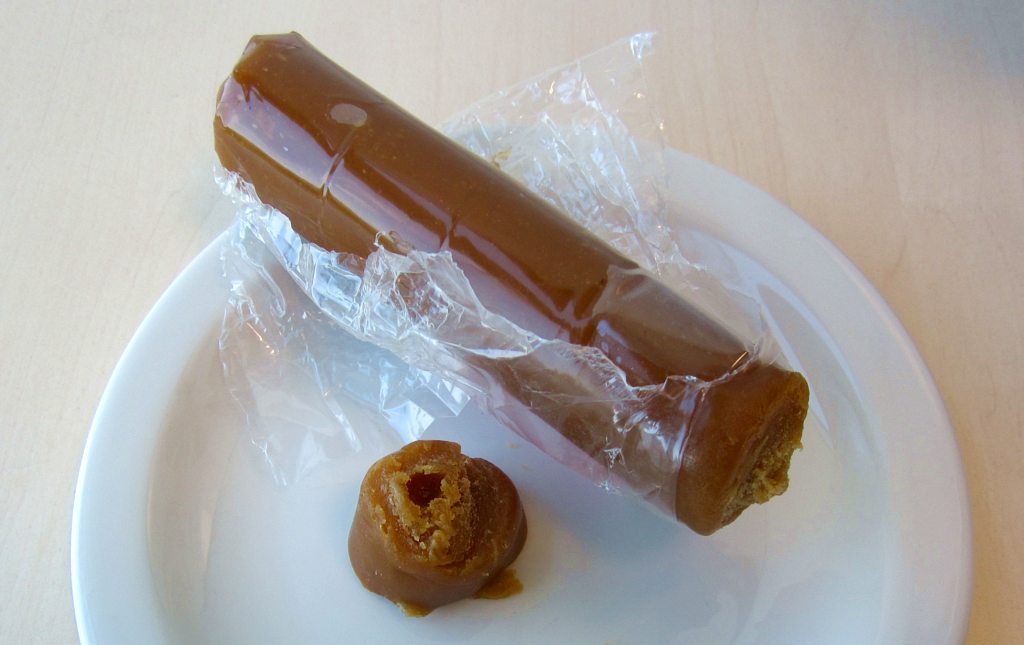
Cake made of durian-flavoured dodol, Indonesian traditional sweet candy

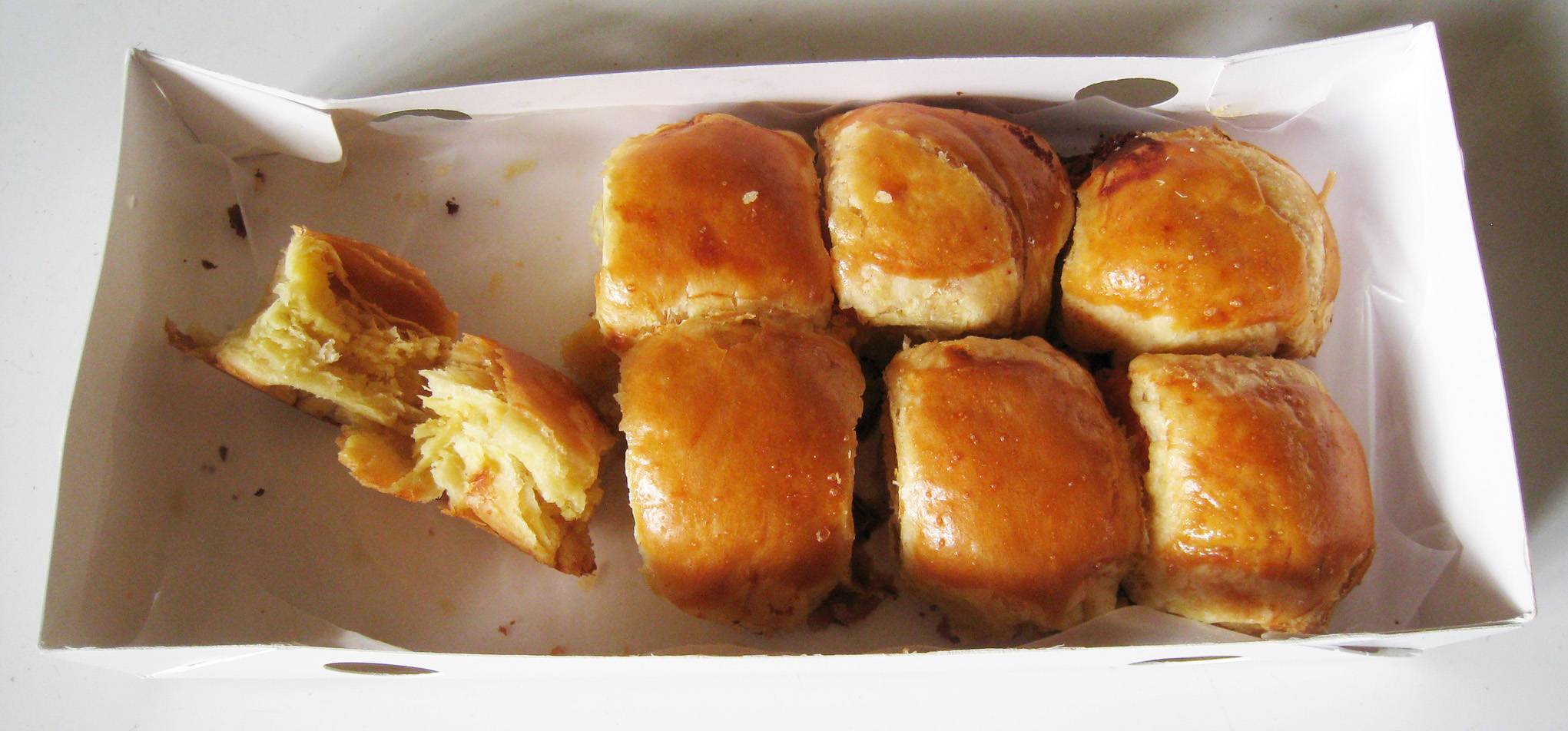
Durian Keju Bollen, a pastry filled with cheese and durian cream in Bandung, West Java

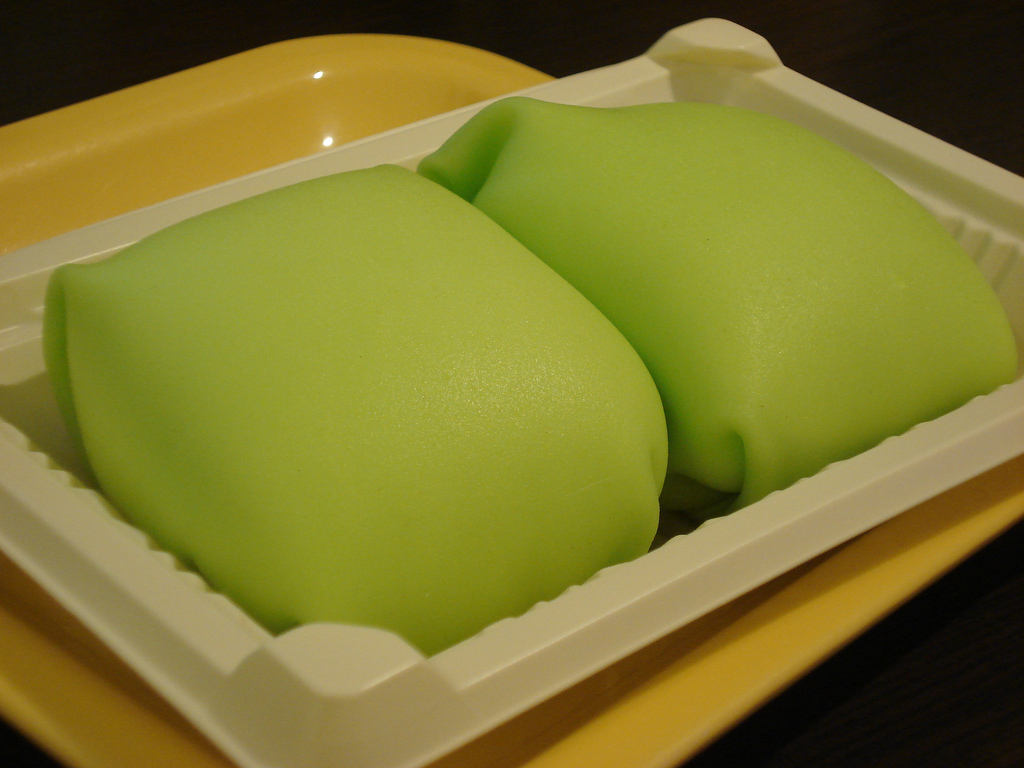
Durian pancake, Indonesia

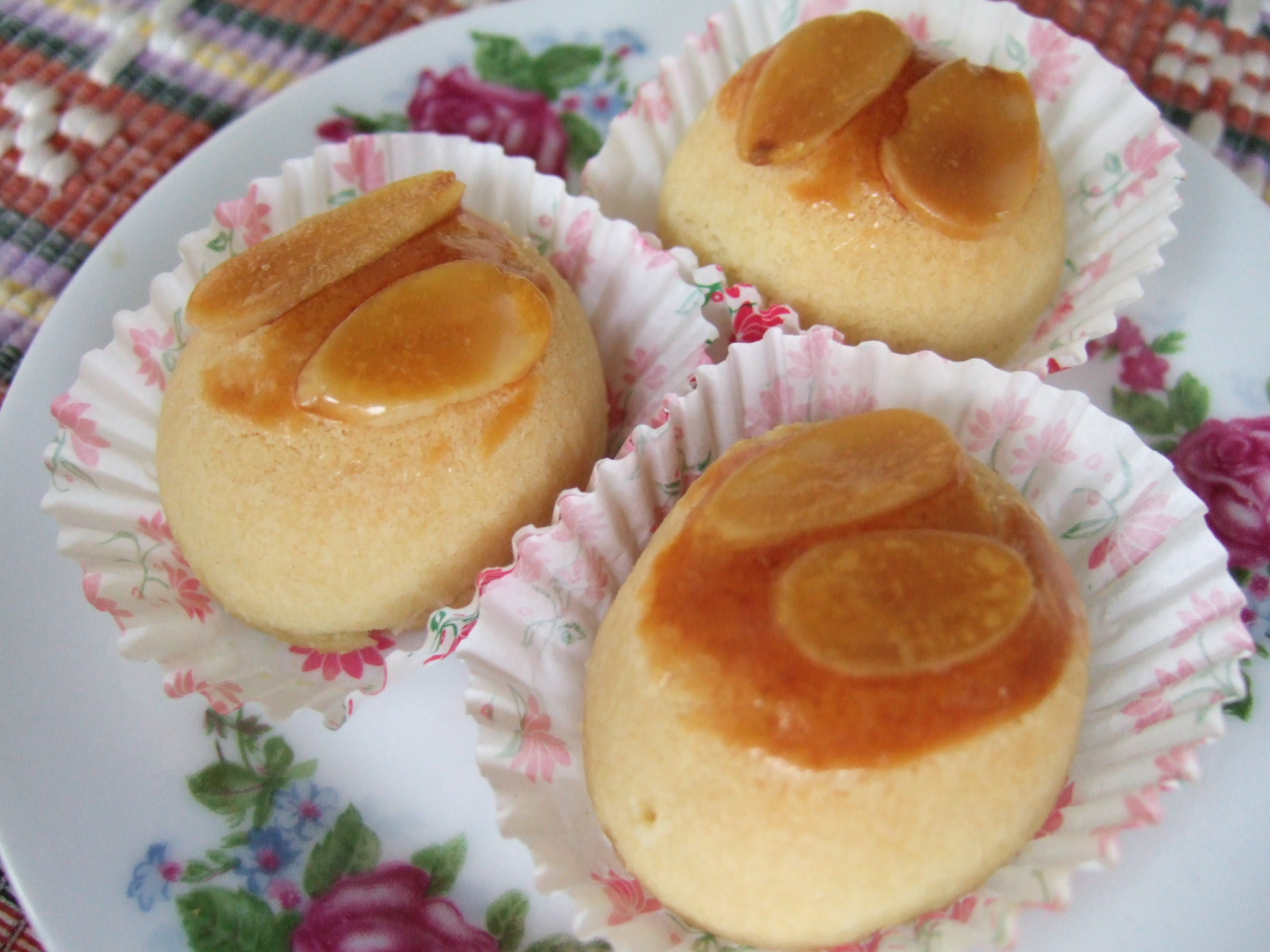
Durian cakes, Pontianak, West Kalimantan

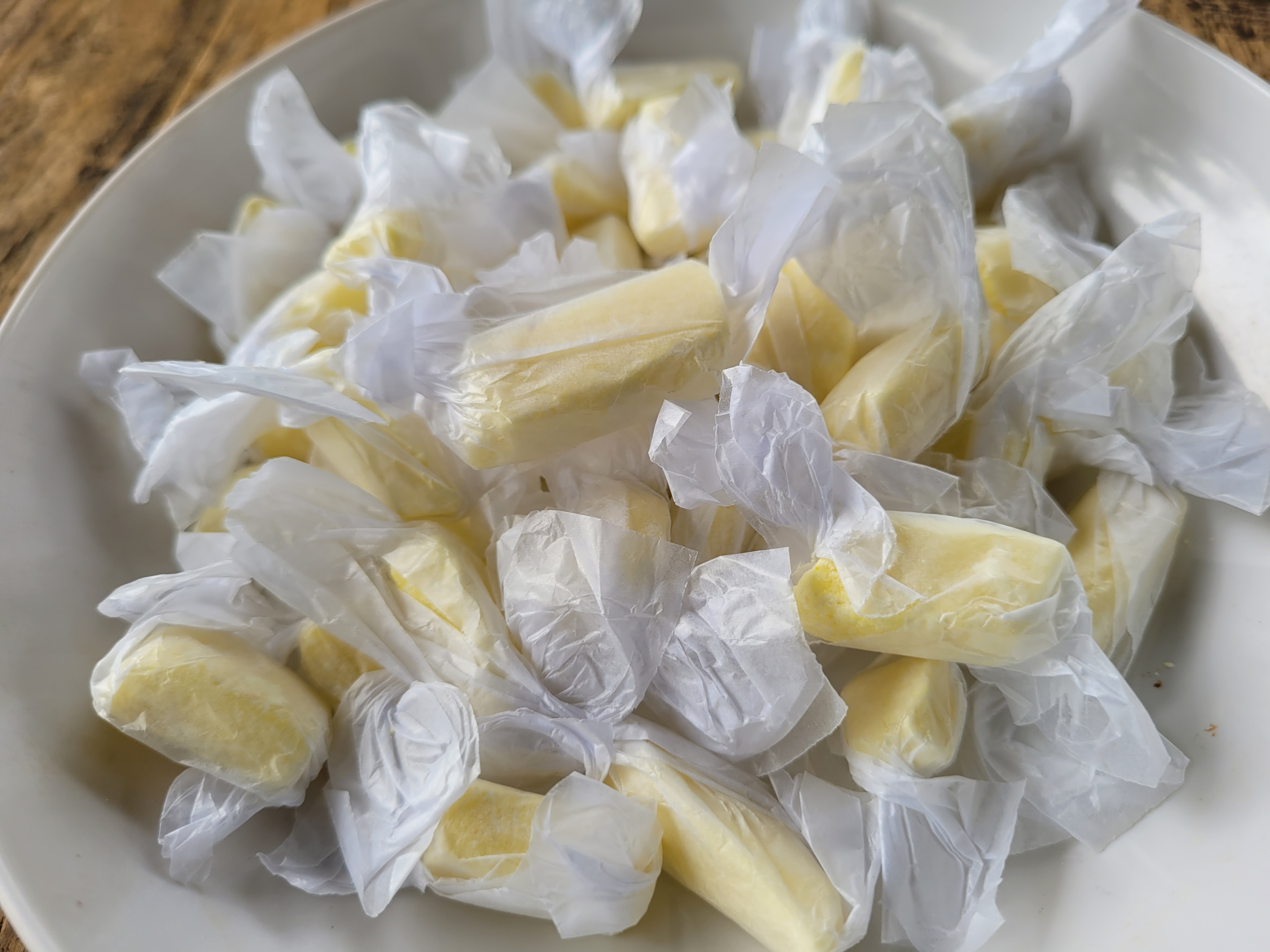
Durian pastillas (durian candy), Philippines

=== Nutrition ===
Raw or fresh frozen durian
Nutritional value per 100 g (3.5 oz)
- Energy: 615 kJ (147 kcal)
- Carbohydrates: 27.09 g
- Dietary fibre: 3.8 g
- Fat: 5.33 g
- Protein: 1.47 g
Vitamins and minerals
Vitamins	Quantity %DV^{†}
Vitamin A	44 IU
Thiamine (B1)	31% 0.374 mg
Riboflavin (B2)	15% 0.2 mg
Niacin (B3)	7% 1.074 mg
Pantothenic acid (B5)	5% 0.23 mg
Vitamin B6	19% 0.316 mg
Folate (B9)	9% 36 μg
Vitamin C	22% 19.7 mg
Minerals	Quantity %DV^{†}
Calcium	0% 6 mg
Copper	23% 0.207 mg
Iron	2% 0.43 mg
Magnesium	7% 30 mg
Manganese	14% 0.325 mg
Phosphorus	3% 39 mg
Potassium	15% 436 mg
Sodium	0% 2 mg
Zinc	3% 0.28 mg
- Other constituents: Quantity
- Water: 65 g
- Link to Full Report from the USDA FoodData Central
- ^{†}Percentages estimated using US recommendations for adults, except for potassium, which is estimated based on expert recommendation from the National Academies.

Raw durian is 65% water, 27% carbohydrates (including 4% dietary fibre), 5% fat and 1% protein (table). In a reference amount of 100 g (3.5 oz), raw or fresh frozen durian provides 31% of the Daily Value (DV) of thiamine and a moderate content of other B vitamins, vitamin C, and the dietary minerals, copper, potassium, and manganese (14–23% DV, table).

Different durian varieties from Malaysia, Thailand and Indonesia vary in their carbohydrate content from 16 to 29%, fat content from 2–5%, protein content from 2–4%, and dietary fibre content from 1–4%, and in caloric value from 84 to 185 kcal per 100 grams. The fatty acids in durian flesh are particularly rich in oleic acid and palmitic acid.

== Culture and folk medicine ==
=== Cultural influences ===
A common local belief is that the durian is harmful when eaten with coffee or alcoholic beverages. In Chinese food therapy, both durians and alcohol are strongly "heaty" foods and combining the two can lead to heatiness. In the 18th century, Rumphius stated that one should not drink alcohol after eating durians as it will cause indigestion and bad breath. In 1929, J. D. Gimlette wrote in his Malay Poisons and Charm Cures that the durian fruit must not be eaten with brandy. In 1981, J. R. Croft wrote in his Bombacaceae: In Handbooks of the Flora of Papua New Guinea that "a feeling of morbidity" often follows the consumption of alcohol too soon after eating durian. Several medical investigations on the validity of this belief have been conducted with varying conclusions, though a study by the University of Tsukuba finds the fruit's high sulfur content inhibits the activity of aldehyde dehydrogenase, causing a 70 percent reduction of the ability to clear certain toxins such as alcohol from the body.

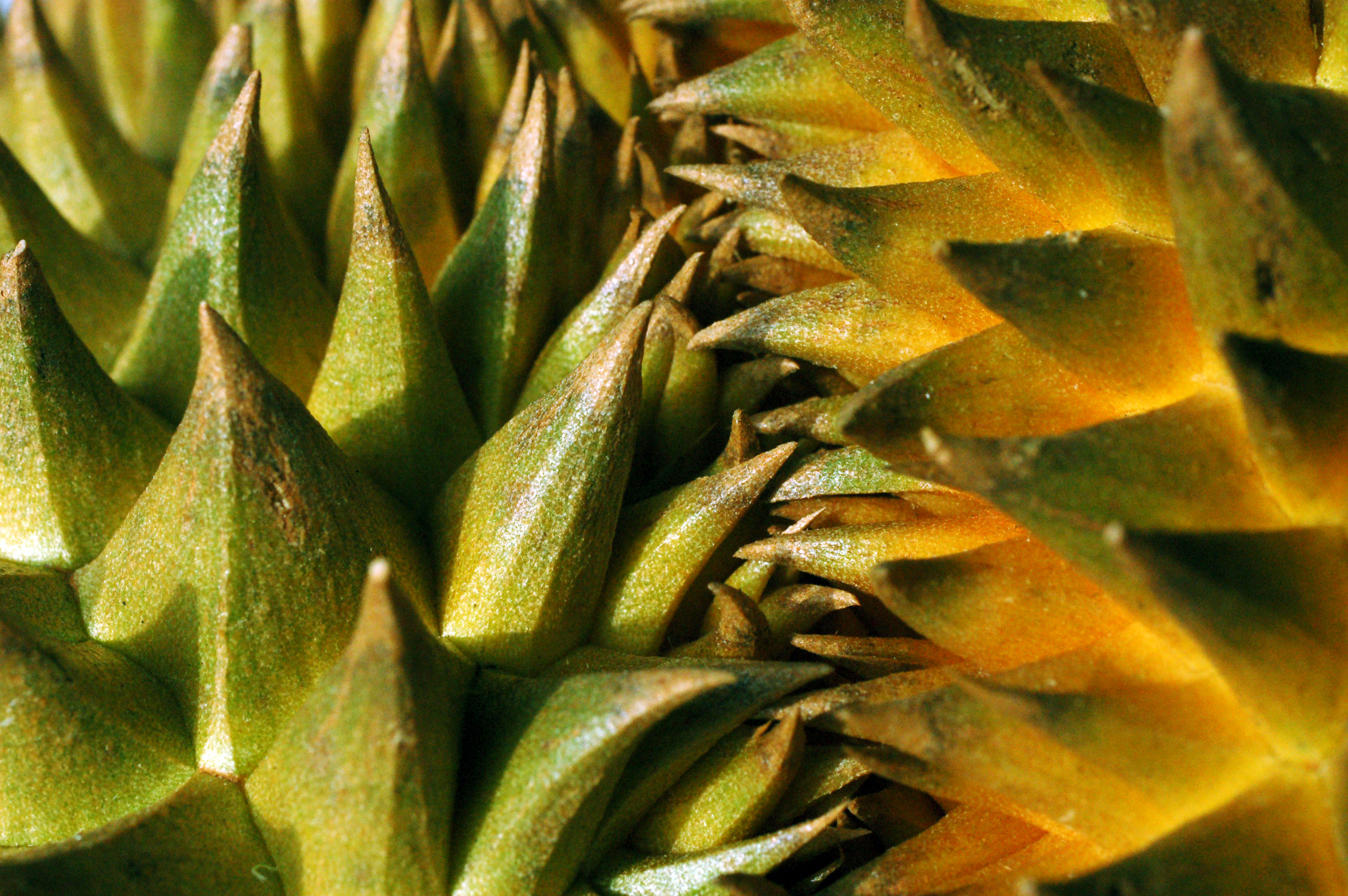
The fruit is covered in sharp thorns, capable of drawing blood.

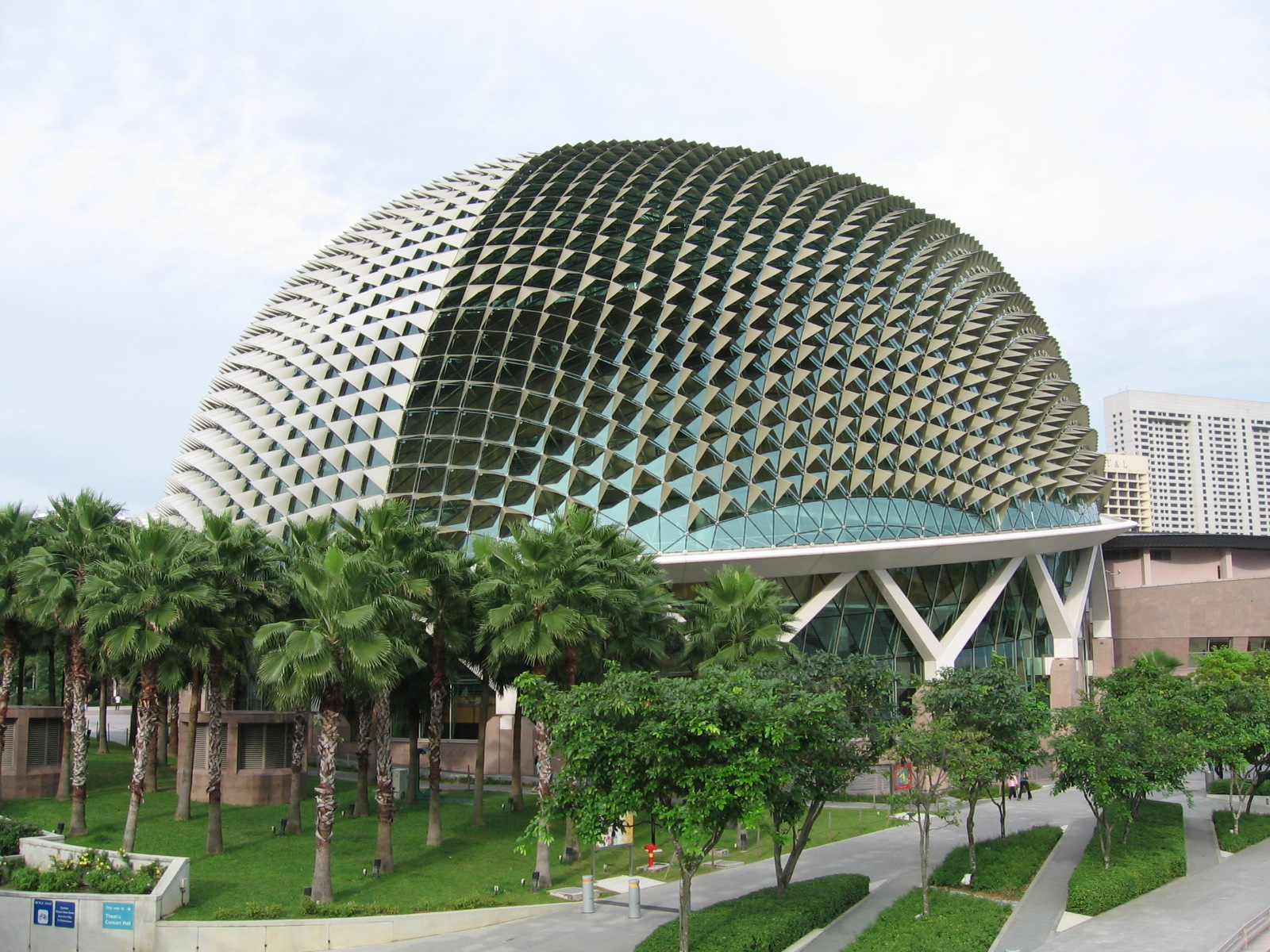
Singapore's Esplanade building, nicknamed "the Durian".

In its native Southeast Asia, the durian is an everyday food and portrayed in the local media in accordance with the cultural perception it has in the region. The durian symbolised the subjective nature of ugliness and beauty in Hong Kong director Fruit Chan's 2000 film Durian Durian (榴槤飄飄, lau lin piu piu), and was a nickname for the reckless but lovable protagonist of the eponymous Singaporean TV comedy Durian King played by Adrian Pang. Likewise, the oddly shaped Esplanade building in Singapore (Theatres on the Bay) is often called "The Durian" by locals, and "The Big Durian" is the nickname of Jakarta, Indonesia.

A saying in Malaysian and Indonesian Malay, mendapat durian runtuh, "getting a fallen durian", is the equivalent of the English phrase 'windfall gain'.

Nevertheless, trees bearing mature durians are dangerous because the fruit is heavy, armed with sharp thorns, and can fall from a significant height. Hardhats are worn when collecting the fruit. A common saying is that a durian has eyes, and can see where it is falling, because the fruit supposedly never falls during daylight hours when people may be hurt. In Malaysia, a spineless durian clone D172 was registered by the Agriculture Department in 1989. It was called "Durian Botak" ('Bald Durian').

Sumatran elephants and tigers sometimes eat durians. Being a fruit much loved by a variety of animals, the durian is sometimes taken to signify the animalistic aspect of humans, as in the legend of Orang Mawas, the Malaysian version of Bigfoot, and Orang Pendek, its Sumatran version, both of which have been claimed to feast on durians.

=== Folk medicine ===
In Malaysia, a decoction of the leaves and roots used to be prescribed as an antipyretic. The leaf juice is applied on the head of a fever patient. The most complete description of the medicinal use of the durian as remedies for fevers is a Malay prescription, collected by Burkill and Haniff in 1930. It instructs the reader to boil the roots of Hibiscus rosa-sinensis with the roots of Durio zibethinus, Nephelium longana, Nephelium mutabile and Artocarpus integrifolius, and drink the decoction or use it as a poultice.

Southeast Asian traditional beliefs, as well as traditional Chinese food therapy, consider the durian fruit to have warming properties liable to cause excessive sweating. The traditional method to counteract this is to pour water into the empty shell of the fruit after the pulp has been consumed and drink it. An alternative method is to eat the durian in accompaniment with mangosteen, which is considered to have cooling properties. Pregnant women or people with high blood pressure are traditionally advised not to consume durian.

The Javanese believe durian to have aphrodisiac qualities, and impose a set of rules on what may or may not be consumed with it or shortly thereafter. A saying in Indonesian, durian jatuh sarung naik, meaning "the durian falls and the sarong comes up", refers to this belief. The warnings against the supposed lecherous quality of this fruit soon spread to the West – the Swedenborgian philosopher Herman Vetterling commented on so-called "erotic properties" of the durian in the early 20th century.

== See also ==
- Breadfruit
- Mango, another "king"
- Delicacy

== Sources ==
- Brown, Michael J. (1997). Durio – A Bibliographic Review (PDF). International Plant Genetic Resources Institute. p. 6. ISBN 978-92-9043-318-7. Archived from the original (PDF) on 13 July 2017.
