= Kino Indonesia =

Indonesian consumer goods company

PT Kino Indonesia Tbk
- Trade name: Kino
- Formerly: Kinocare Era Kosmetindo (1999–2014)
- Type: Public
- Traded as: IDX: KINO
- Industry: Consumer goods
- Predecessor: Kino Sentra Industrindo
- Founded: 8 February 1999; 27 years ago
- Founder: Harry Sanusi
- Headquarters: Kino Tower, Tangerang, Banten, Indonesia
- Area served: Worldwide
- Key people: Sidharta Prawira Oetama (President Director)
- Products: Toothpastes; Beverages; Shampoos; Pastries; Cosmetics; Lotions; Candies; Chocolates; Energy drinks; Cologne; Pharmaceuticals; OTC drugs; Jamu; Cleaning agents; Air fresheners; Pet foods
- Services: Distribution
- Revenue: ▼ Rp 3.98 trillion (2021)
- Net income: ▼ Rp 100.65 billion (2021)
- Total assets: ▲ Rp 5.35 trillion (2021)
- Total equity: ▲ Rp 2.663,63 billion (2021)
- Number of employees: 5,330 (2021)
- Subsidiaries: Kino International; Kino Ecomm Solusindo; Kino Malee Trading; Dutalestari Sentratama; Ristra Group
- Website: www.kino.co.id

PT Kino Indonesia Tbk, formerly PT Kinocare Era Kosmetindo, or simply known as Kino, is an Indonesian multinational consumer goods company headquartered in Tangerang, Banten, founded in 1999 by Harry Sanusi. It specializes the manufacturing of its products in the wide range of personal care, hygiene, health care, confectionery, pastry, beverages, and pet care. As of 2022, the company is currently led by Sidharta Prawira Oetama as its president director while Sanusi act as its president commissioner.

== History ==
The origin of Kino Indonesia started from the small distribution company called Dutalestari Sentratama (DLS), that was founded in 1991 by Pontianak businessman Harry Sanusi, with the Rp 300 million capital. At the time, DLS was the sole distributor of the Three Legs Cooling Water, which manufactured and marketed by Sinde Budi Sentosa under license of Singapore-based company Wen Ken Group. However, the relationship of DLS and Sinde has strained in late 1996. In 1997, Sanusi founded Kino Sentra Industrindo (KSI) which produced candies, snacks, chocolate and the flavoured drinks. The first product that launched by KSI was Kino Candy.

With the successful achievement in the past, he established Kinocare Era Kosmetindo on 8 February 1999, that produced the wide range of personal care and hygiene products. The products were launched by Kinocare at the time, such as Ovale 2 in 1 face lotion, followed by Ellips hair care, Resik-V feminine hygiene, and Eskulin perfumes. In 2003, Kino expanded the business segment through the product diversification that specialized on baby care and household with the launch of Sleek and Sleek Baby.

In April 2011, Kino hold the license of the Three Legs Brand for Indonesian market under the agreement of Wen Ken Group, which previously handled by Sinde Budi Sentosa (which relaunched the certain products under its own "Cap Badak" branding later).

In May 2013, Kino partnered with Japanese confectionery maker Morinaga & Company to established a joint venture named Morinaga Kino Indonesia that started its operation on 1 November 2013, where Morinaga holds 51% stake and Kino holds remaining 49% stake and used the bulk of facility that originally owned by Kino Sentra Industrindo. In January 2019, Kino acquired the Morinaga's stake in the joint venture for Rp 74,89 billion and changed its name to Kino Food Indonesia, giving Kino's full control again in the food business.

In September 2014, Kinocare Era Kosmetindo changed its name to Kino Indonesia as part of corporate restructuring whilst becominh the holding company. On 11 December 2015, Kino listed its shares on the Indonesia Stock Exchange through an initial public offering at the price of Rp 3.800 per share, after being planned since September 2011.

In May 2016, Kino entered the herbal medication industry through an acquisition of Surya Herbal, the owner of Dua Putri Dewi brand, for Rp 29 billion.

In August 2016, Kino expanded its cosmetic business segment, with the acquisition of the Ristra Group at 80% majority stake for Rp 80 billion. Sanusi stated that the reason of Kino to acquire Ristra is that the brand implemented the rare dermatology concept which never did by its competitors before, called as "cosmeceutical and evidence based safe cosmetic", and the brand still has a great value and heritage for its consumers. As part of the acquisition, Kino also gain the control of the 12 House of Ristra clinics and seven Ristra Care Center outlets.

In November 2017, Kino established the relationship with Thai beverage company Malee Group, in order to sell the Malee-branded products in Indonesia. The companies formed three joint ventures, such as Kino Malee Indonesia, Malee Kino Company Limited and Kino Malee Trading. However, the two former companies were liquidated in June 2020 due to ingredient limitations, while Kino Malee Trading continued to operate today.

== Operations ==
Kino Indonesia is headquartered at the Kino Tower, in the Alam Sutera complex, located in Tangerang, Banten. In addition, it also has seven branch offices in Malaysia, Singapore, Cambodia, the Philippines, Japan, China, and Vietnam. Kino has 166 distribution networks nationwide and 40 countries internationally.

== Brands ==
=== Personal care ===
- Absolute
- Abstract
- B&B
- Click
- Ellips
- Eskulin
  - Eskulin Kids
- Master
  - Master Kids
- Ovale
- Resik-V
- Ristra
  - Ristra Platinum
- Samantha
- Sasha

=== Household ===
- Evergreen
- Instance
- Sleek
  - Sleek Baby

=== Foods and beverages ===
- Cap Panda
- Chew-Chew Ball
- Frenta
- Kino
  - Kino Candy
  - Kino Nastar
- Larutan Penyegar Cap Kaki Tiga (under license of Wen Ken Group)
  - Larutan Penyegar Cap Kaki Tiga Anak
- Malee (under license of Malee Group)
  - Malee Coco
  - Malee Juice
- Oplozz
- Panther Energy
- Segar Sari
- Sejuk Segar
- Snackit
  - Snackit Marshmallow
  - Snackit Pia 100

=== Health care ===
- Cap Kaki Tiga (under license of Wen Ken Group)
- Dua Putri Dewi
- Lola Remedios
- Q-Life

=== Pet care ===
- MaxLife
- ProBalance
- ProDiet
