= Benjamin syndrome =

- Other names: Benjamin anemia

Benjamin syndrome is a type of multiple congenital anomaly/intellectual disability syndrome. It is characterized by hypochromic anemia with intellectual disability and various craniofacial and other anomalies. It can also include heart murmur, dental caries and splenic tumors.

It was first described in the medical literature in 1911. Symptoms include megalocephaly, external ear deformities, dental caries, micromelia, hypoplastic bone deformities, hypogonadism, hypochromic anemia with occasional tumors, and intellectual disability.
