= Shanghuo =

Pathology in Chinese traditional medicine

Shanghuo (Chinese: 上火; pinyin: shàng huǒ; lit. 'fire elevates'), also known as Reqi (Chinese: 热气; pinyin: rè qì; Jyutping: jit⁶ hei³; lit. 'hot air') or Heatiness is a concept related to Traditional Chinese Medicine that involves an imbalance in internal energy that causes negative health effects on the body. It is a widely held belief among East Asian people, although it is not accepted by science.

== Description ==
In traditional Chinese beliefs, there are five elements: earth, wood, water, metal and fire. When Yin and Yang are out of balance in a person, this causes fire to be elevated in the person's body producing effects such as fever, sore throat, preference for cold drinks and/or other effects.

== Causes ==
The consumption of certain foods are commonly thought to cause shanghuo in people. Some examples of the foods linked to shanghuo are durian, raw pineapples, pomegranates and spicy food.

== Treatment ==
In order to treat the condition of shanghuo, different foods are commonly recommended to be consumed that are "cold". By this is not necessarily meant foods that are physically cold (as in temperature), but rather foods that put out the internal "fire" related to the shanghuo condition. Among such foods include bitter gourd, watermelon, cucumber, eggplant, strawberries, and many others.

Certain less common foods are also used to treat shanghuo. For example, turtle jelly, traditionally made from turtle shells, is also believed to be a good food to consume to deal with shanghuo. In traditional Chinese medicine, ground minerals like gypsum and calcite are believed to have cooling effects, and they are commercially available in preparations like Three Legs Cooling Water.

In southeastern China, it is traditional to drink Chinese herbal tea (Chinese: 凉茶; pinyin: liáng chá; lit. 'cool tea') to treat shanghuo.

== See also ==
- Inflammation
