= Hypochromic anemia =

Medical condition

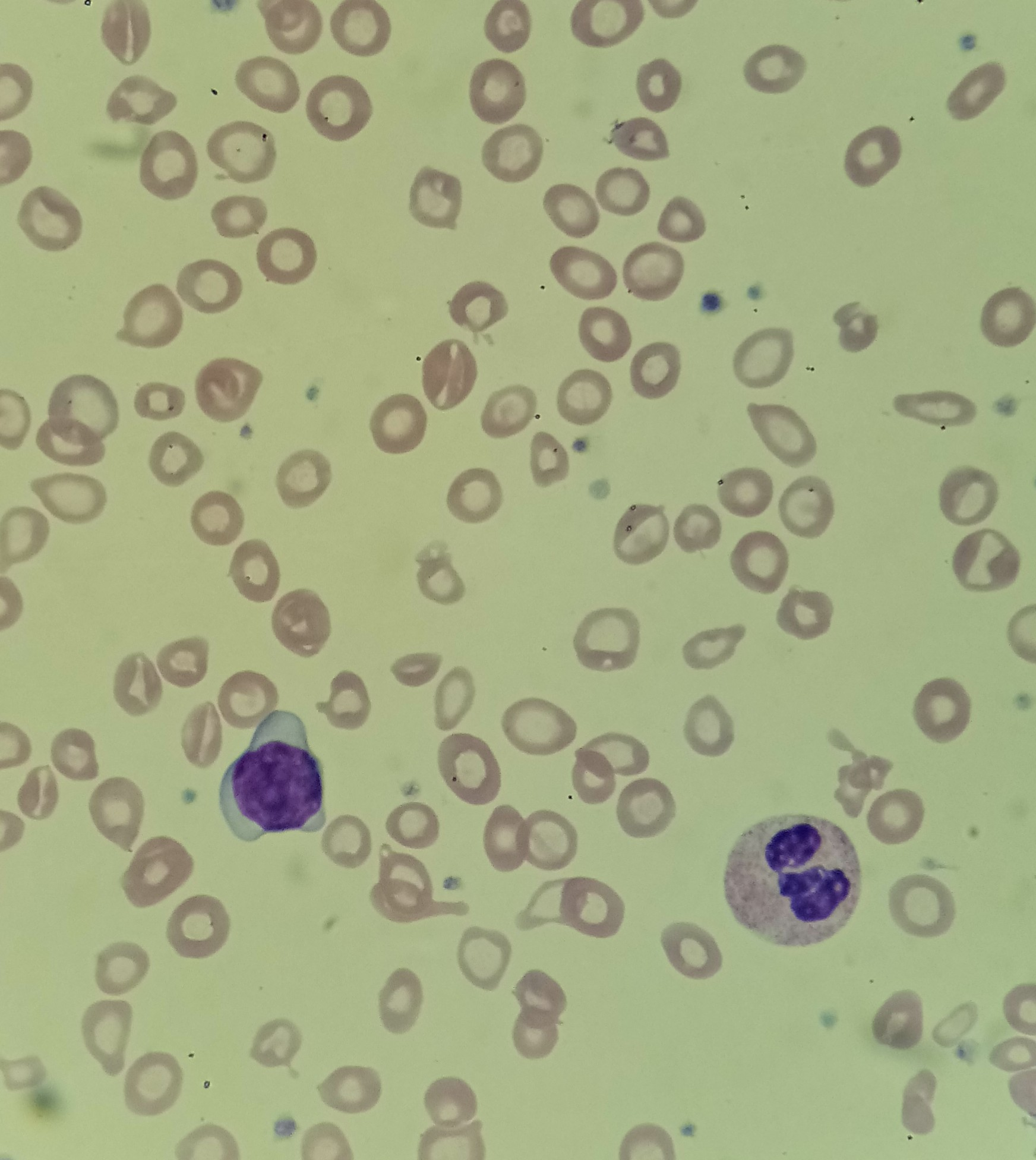
A blood smear showing hypochromic (and microcytic) anemia. Note the increased central pallor of the red blood cells.

Hypochromic anemia is a generic term for any type of anemia in which the red blood cells are paler than normal. (Hypo- refers to less, and chromic means colour.) A normal red blood cell has a biconcave disk shape and will have an area of pallor in its center when viewed microscopically. In hypochromic cells, this area of central pallor is increased. This decrease in redness is due to a disproportionate reduction of red cell hemoglobin (the pigment that imparts the red color) in proportion to the volume of the cell. Clinically the color can be evaluated by the mean corpuscular hemoglobin (MCH) or mean corpuscular hemoglobin concentration (MCHC). The MCHC is considered the better parameter of the two as it adjusts for effect the size of the cell has on its amount of hemoglobin. Hypochromia is clinically defined as below the normal MCH reference range of 27–33 picograms/cell in adults or below the normal MCHC reference range of 33–36 g/dL in adults.

Red blood cells will also be small (microcytic), leading to substantial overlap with the category of microcytic anemia. The most common causes of this kind of anemia are iron deficiency and thalassemia.

Hypochromic anemia was historically known as chlorosis or green sickness for the distinct skin tinge sometimes present in patients, in addition to more general symptoms such as a lack of energy, shortness of breath, dyspepsia, headaches, a capricious or scanty appetite and amenorrhea.

== Historical understanding ==
Pandar
Now, the pox upon her green-sickness for me!

Bawd
'Faith, there's no way to be rid on't but by the way to the pox. Here comes the Lord Lysimachus disguised.

Shakespeare (attrib). Pericles Prince of Tyre

In 1554, German physician Johannes Lange described a condition, which he called "the disease of virgins" because, he said, it was "peculiar to virgins". The symptoms were wide-ranging, including an appearance which is "pale, as if bloodless", an aversion to food (especially meat), difficulty in breathing, palpitations and swollen ankles. He prescribed that those affected should "live with men and copulate. If they conceive, they will recover." The symptom picture overlaps to some extent with an earlier condition described in English medical texts, "the green sickness", which was a form of jaundice. However, Lange shifted the cause from digestive errors to the patient remaining a virgin, despite being of the age for marriage. The name "chlorosis" was coined in 1615 by Montpellier professor of medicine Jean Varandal from the ancient Greek word "chloros" meaning "greenish-yellow", "pale green", "pale", "pallid" or "fresh". Both Lange and Varandal claimed Hippocrates as a reference, but their lists of symptoms do not match that in the Hippocratic Disease of Virgins, a treatise that was translated into Latin in the 1520s and thus became available to early modern Europe.

In addition to "green sickness", the condition was known as morbus virgineus ("virgin's disease") or febris amatoria ("lover's fever"). Francis Grose's 1811 Dictionary of the Vulgar Tongue defined "green sickness" as: "The disease of maids occasioned by celibacy."

In 1681, English physician Thomas Sydenham classified chlorosis as a hysterical disease affecting not only adolescent girls but also "slender and weakly women that seem consumptive." He advocated iron as a treatment: "To the worn out or languid blood it gives a spur or fillip whereby the animal spirits which lay prostrate and sunken under their own weight are raised and excited".

Daniel Turner in 1714 preferred to term chlorosis "the Pale or White Sickness ... since in its worst State the Complexion is rarely or ever a true Green, tho' bordering on that Hue". He went on to describe it as "an ill Habit of Body, arising either from Obstructions, particularly of the menstrual Purgation, or from a Congestion of crude Humours in the Viscera, vitiating the Ferments of the Bowels, especially those of Concoction, and placing therein a depraved Appetite of Things directly preternatural, as Chalk, Cinders, Earth, Sand, &c". One of his case studies was that of an 11-year-old girl who was found, on investigation, to have been eating large quantities of coal.

Chlorosis is briefly mentioned in Casanova's Histoire de ma vie: "I do not know, but we have some physicians who say that chlorosis in girls is the result of that pleasure onanism indulged in to excess".

In 1841, the Bohemian doctor and pharmacist Albert Popper published a treatment for Chlorosis containing Vitriolum martis (sulfuric acid and iron) and Sal tartari (potassium carbonate) in Österreichische medicinische Wochenschrift which was republished and refined in the following years.

In 1845, the French writer Auguste Saint-Arroman gave a recipe for a treatment by medicinal chocolate that included iron filings in his De L'action du café, du thé et du chocolat sur la santé, et de leur influence sur l'intelligence et le moral de l'homme and in 1872, French physician Armand Trousseau also advocated treatment with iron, although he still classified chlorosis as a "nervous disease".

In 1887, physician Sir Andrew Clark of London Hospital proposed a physiological cause for chlorosis, tying its onset to the demands placed on the bodies of adolescent girls by growth and menarche. In 1891, Frank Wedekind's play Spring Awakening referenced the disease. In 1895, University of Edinburgh pathologist Prof Ralph Stockman built upon experiments demonstrating that inorganic iron contributed to hemoglobin synthesis to show that chlorosis could be explained by a deficiency in iron brought on by loss of menstrual blood and an inadequate diet. Despite the work of Stockman and the effectiveness of iron in treating the symptoms of chlorosis, debate about its cause continued into the 1930s. A character in T. C. Boyle's The Road to Wellville has chlorosis, and the narrator describes her green skin and black lips.

In 1936, Arthur J. Patek and Clark W. Heath of Harvard Medical School concluded that chlorosis was identical to hypochromic anemia. More recently, some people have suggested that it may have been endometriosis, but the historical descriptions cannot easily be mapped on to this condition.

== Acquired forms ==
Hypochromic anemia may be caused by vitamin B6 deficiency from a low iron intake, diminished iron absorption, or excessive iron loss. It can also be caused by infections (e.g. hookworms) or other diseases (i.e. anemia of chronic disease), therapeutic drugs, copper toxicity, and lead poisoning. It may also occur from severe stomach or intestinal bleeding caused by ulcers or medications such as aspirin or bleeding from hemorrhoids.

One acquired form of anemia is also known as Faber's syndrome.

== Hereditary forms ==
Hypochromic anemia occurs in patients with hypochromic microcytic anemia with iron overload. The condition is autosomal recessive and is caused by mutations in the SLC11A2 gene. The condition prevents red blood cells from accessing iron in the blood, which causes anemia that is apparent at birth. It can lead to pallor, fatigue, and slow growth. The iron overload aspect of the disorder means that the iron accumulates in the liver and can cause liver impairment in adolescence or early adulthood.It also occurs in patients with hereditary iron refractory iron-deficiency anemia (IRIDA). Patients with IRIDA have very low serum iron and transferrin saturation, but their serum ferritin is normal or high. The anemia is usually moderate in severity and presents later in childhood.Hypochromic anemia is also caused by thalassemia and congenital disorders like Benjamin anemia.

== See also ==
- Microcytic anemia
- Iron deficiency anemia
- List of circulatory system conditions
- List of hematologic conditions
- Green children of Woolpit
