= Auguste Saint-Arroman =

Auguste Saint-Arroman was a French writer on varied subjects, who is remembered for his curious work in cultural pharmacology, De L'action du café, du thé et du chocolat sur la santé, et de leur influence sur l'intelligence et le moral de l'homme (Turin, 1845), published as Coffee, Tea and Chocolate: Their Influence upon the Health, the Intellect, and the Moral Nature of Man. Translated from the French of M. Saint-Arroman (Philadelphia) 1846. Saint-Arroman reported that chocolate, while suited to the aged and the weak, was dangerous if drunk by the young. His recipe for medicinal chocolate that treated chlorosis in women, included iron filings.

He was also the author of the brief essay L’Anthanasie de Cabanis, ou la Médecine des incurables, à l’usage des médecins et du clergé (Bordeaux: Balarac, 1857). His response to the Fourierists was published in the form of a Réponse à M. le Dr. Arthur de Bonnard sur sa brochure intitulée : Organisation d’une commune sociétaire d’après la théorie de Charles Fourier (Paris: Desloges, 1845). In the revolutionary year of 1848 he briefly served as editor of a Journal illustré écrit en l'honneur des gardes mobiles; the Journal published only two issues, 6 and 13 August.
