= Herman Vetterling =

Herman Constantin Vetterling (2 August 1849 – 5 September 1931), also known as Herman Carl Vetterling and by the pseudonym Philangi Dasa, was an American Swedenborgian philosopher who converted to Buddhism in 1884 and took the Arabic-cum-Sanskritic name Philangi Dasa (meaning "Western Devotee").

Vetterling was born in Pjätteryd, Kronoberg, Småland, Sweden, and emigrated to the United States in 1873. He was naturalized in Philadelphia in 1880. He was one of the first Americans to officially embrace Buddhism. He founded The Buddhist Ray in Santa Cruz, California in 1887, which was the first Buddhist journal in the United States.

His best known work was Swedenborg the Buddhist, or The Higher Swedenborgianism: Its Secrets and Thibetan Origin, published in 1887. It is a fictional spiritual dialogue between Swedenborg, a Buddhist monk, a Brahmin, a Parsi, an Aztec Indian, an Icelander, an anonymous woman, and Vetterling himself. Six years later this work was translated into Japanese.

Due to his eclectic combination of Swedenborgianism, Theosophy, Buddhism, homeopathy and Spiritualism, many scholars of his lifetime questioned his authenticity as a "real" Buddhist.
