= Three Legs Cooling Water =

Traditional Chinese medicine drink

Three Legs Cooling Water, Singapore Packaging

Three Legs Cooling Water (Chinese: 三脚标清热水) is a traditional Chinese medicine (TCM) drink produced by Wen Ken Group. It is the main product produced since the company was first established.

The drink is said to be effective in preventing or alleviating common ailments such as ulcer, fever or toothache which can occur as a result of too much shanghuo ("heatiness") within the body. Other general symptoms indicating heatiness include red eyes, profuse sweating, irritability, loss of concentration, and fatigue. A diet with too much fried or spicy food, consumption of alcohol, stress, smoking, late nights and humid weather are also some factors that can easily upset the body and cause the condition of shanghuo.

Three Legs Cooling Water comprises de-ionised water and the natural mineral, gypsum (Chinese: 石膏; pinyin: Shígāo). Gypsum fibrosum is a type of plaster stone containing calcium sulphate and is said to be "cooling by nature".

== History ==
The Three Legs Brand was founded in 1937 when Wen Ken Group was established in what was then British Malaya now known as Malaysia. The cooling water was one of the company's four main products which also included headache powder, cough relief and tinea skin solution. The four products were developed based on traditional medical recipes owned by the founders, all of whom originated from China. These products were marketed as over-the-counter medical solutions to relieve common ailments such as shanghuo, cough, headache and skin rashes.

The recipe for Three Legs Cooling Water is derived from a traditional mineral preparation devised to dispel shanghuo the body. In the past, Three Legs Cooling Water was mainly consumed as an affordable medicinal product for many of the Chinese immigrants who developed heatiness-related ailments as they sought to acclimatise to the tropical heat and humidity after settling in the Nanyang region for work.

In the 1980s, Wen Ken's factory officially stopped the use of glass bottles by using plastic bottles instead. Many consumers saw plastic as more lightweight and convenient, boosting sales.

As Three Legs Cooling Water became increasingly popular in the 1980s, other competitors began producing imitations and forgeries in a bid to capitalise on its sales. To resolve this issue and calm dissatisfied customers, the company invested RM 200,000 in a plastic bottle moulding machine that creates indents of the Three Legs Brand logo on the neck of every bottle. This enabled customers to differentiate the TCM-certified Three Legs Cooling Water from imitations on the market.

== Alternative product label ==
Three Legs Cooling Water, Malaysia Packaging

The earliest and original bottle of Three Legs Cooling Water features the image of a rhinoceros on its label. According to the company, although the drink comprises Chinese herbs and does not contain any ingredients from the animal, the company picked a rhinoceros as its icon because the horn of rhinoceros was traditionally associated with 'cooling' properties in Chinese propriety medicine. Between the 1950s and 1990s, Three Legs Cooling Water was sold in Singapore, Malaysia and Indonesia featuring a rhinoceros on its product label.

In the early 1990s, the Singapore Ministry of Health requested that the company drop the image of the rhinoceros from its product label. The concern cited was that since all products related to rhinoceros (an endangered species) were prohibited for sale in the country, featuring the rhinoceros on the product packaging might give the impression that the prohibited ingredient had been used in its production. This compelled the company to devise an alternative packaging for the Three Legs Cooling Water sold in Singapore, which does not feature the image of the rhinoceros at all (refer to product image at the top).

== Product extensions ==
Cool Rhino

In 2008, Wen Ken Group launched a new and more modern version of their original Three Legs Cooling Water. The new drink, Cool Rhino, contains almost exactly the same contents as the original cooling water except for an extra ingredient, calcitum. This additional ingredient is said to enhance the cooling properties of the drink. Cool Rhino derives its name from a combination of the original Three Legs Cooling Water and the symbol of a rhino on the Malaysian version of the label. The drink can also be frozen into ice cubes or be used as a mixer with other drinks.

Cool Rhino departs from the original cooling water in terms of its packaging and target consumers. Intended as a newer and trendier version of Three Legs Cooling Water, it was introduced to capture the younger consumers in the market. In 2008, Cool Rhino was granted the Malaysia Good Design Mark by the Malaysian government.

Along with Cool Rhino, Wen Ken Group also launched another product extension, Cool Rhino O2, in 2008. However, Cool Rhino O2 is distributed only in Malaysia and Hong Kong. Although similar to Cool Rhino, Cool Rhino O2 is enriched with additional oxygen, which is supposed to help to increase the number of oxygen-carrying red blood cells within the body.

== Ingredients ==
Gypsum fibrosum, calcitum, deionised water.
