= Iron preparation =

Iron preparation is the formulation for iron supplements indicated in prophylaxis and treatment of iron-deficiency anemia. Examples of iron preparation include ferrous sulfate, ferrous gluconate, and ferrous fumarate. It can be administered orally, and by intravenous injection, or intramuscular injection.

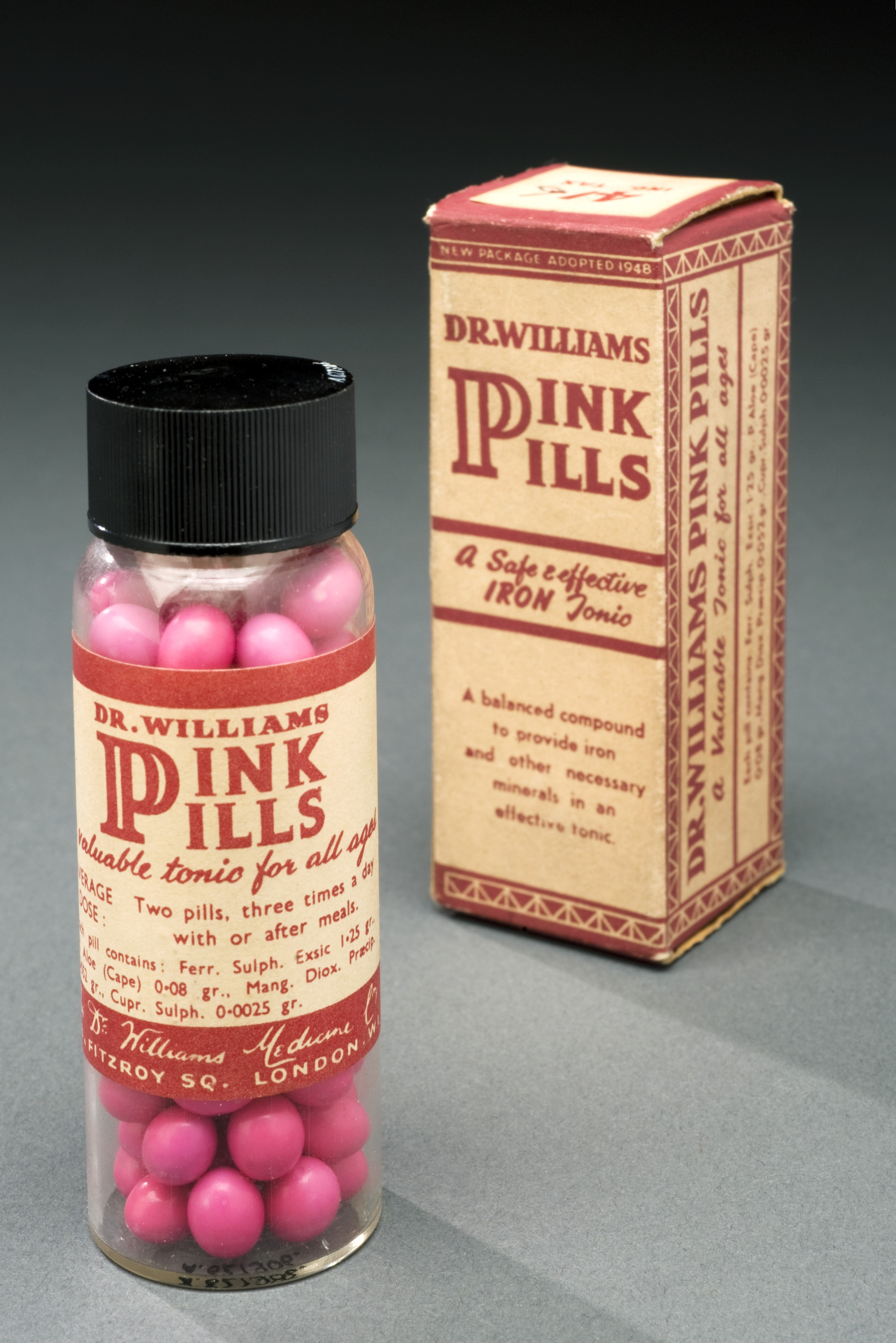
Early Iron Supplement for Anemia

Iron preparation stimulates red blood cell production. The action is regulated by various iron-binding proteins in the body, such as ferritin and transferrin. After transferring to the bone marrow cells, iron forms a complex with heme proteins for hemoglobin synthesis.

Different dosage forms of iron preparation have different absorption mechanisms. Iron in oral iron preparations is absorbed in the gut via transporters and carrier proteins and released to the bloodstream. Iron in parenteral iron preparation needs to be released by the cleavage of the surrounding complex by macrophages. After reaching the bloodstream, it becomes a part of the endogenous iron pool and establishes normal human iron distribution, metabolism, and elimination.

Iron poisoning is a fatal medical condition. Due to the saturation of iron-binding protein ferritin, iron in the plasma becomes toxic, promoting peroxidative mitochondrial damage and thus cell death. The process of iron toxicity is divided into four clinical stages, which are gastrointestinal damage, improvement in condition, metabolic acidosis and hepatic failure, and intestinal obstruction due to scarring. Whole bowel irrigation and iron chelation are used in the treatment of iron poisoning.

== Mechanism of action ==
Iron supplements encourage erythropoiesis to increase red blood cell (RBC) production and oxygen transportation in the circulating system. The transportation of non-heme iron across the apical membrane is through divalent metal transporter 1(DMT1) while that of heme iron is through heme carrier protein 1(HCP1) in the small intestine. Iron is then incorporated and stored as ferritin in macrophages, increasing the iron stock in the body. Ferritin is then converted into an absorbable form of Fe2+ to bind to transferrin - an iron transporter in the blood circulation. The raised in transferrin level carried to the bone marrow cells stimulates RBC production, facilitating oxygen transportation in the bloodstream.

== Pharmacokinetics ==
=== Oral administration ===
Non-heme and heme oral iron preparations are absorbed into the systemic circulation via different mechanisms.

Non-heme iron is present in a form of Fe3+ and undergoes reduction to Fe2+ in the duodenum by duodenal cytochrome b (Dcyt b). Reduced iron is then imported into divalent metal transporter 1(DMT1) into the enterocyte cytoplasm, either transported into bloodstream by the basolateral transport protein ferroportin or stored as ferritin.

For heme iron, heme oxygenase catalyzes the release of Fe2+ from heme, and Fe2+ enters the enterocyte cytosolic iron pool. However, the uptake mechanism is not well-understood. Haem carrier protein 1(HCP1) has been suggested to transport heme iron into the enterocyte, but has later been proven to have a much higher affinity in the transportation of folate. The absorption of heme iron is 2–3 times faster than non-heme iron.

After absorption, the iron from preparation becomes part of the iron pool in the body. Upon stimulation, the reduction of iron storage Fe3+ in the enterocyte to Fe2+ ferroportin allows the passage of iron through the cell membrane for export. In the blood, ferroportin is then converted to transferrin to reach other tissues.

The gastrointestinal (GI) absorption process depends on many factors, including the dosage form, dose, endogenous erythropoiesis process and diet. The most significant factor regulating iron uptake is the amount of iron present in the body. Iron absorption increases with sufficient iron storage and vice versa. Increased erythrocyte synthesis also stimulates iron absorption in the gut. Therefore, oral bioavailability of iron varies greatly, ranging from less than 1% to greater than 50%. Uptake of iron can be enhanced by dietary heme iron and vitamin C, while inhibited by calcium, polyphenols, tannins and phytates.

=== Parenteral administration ===
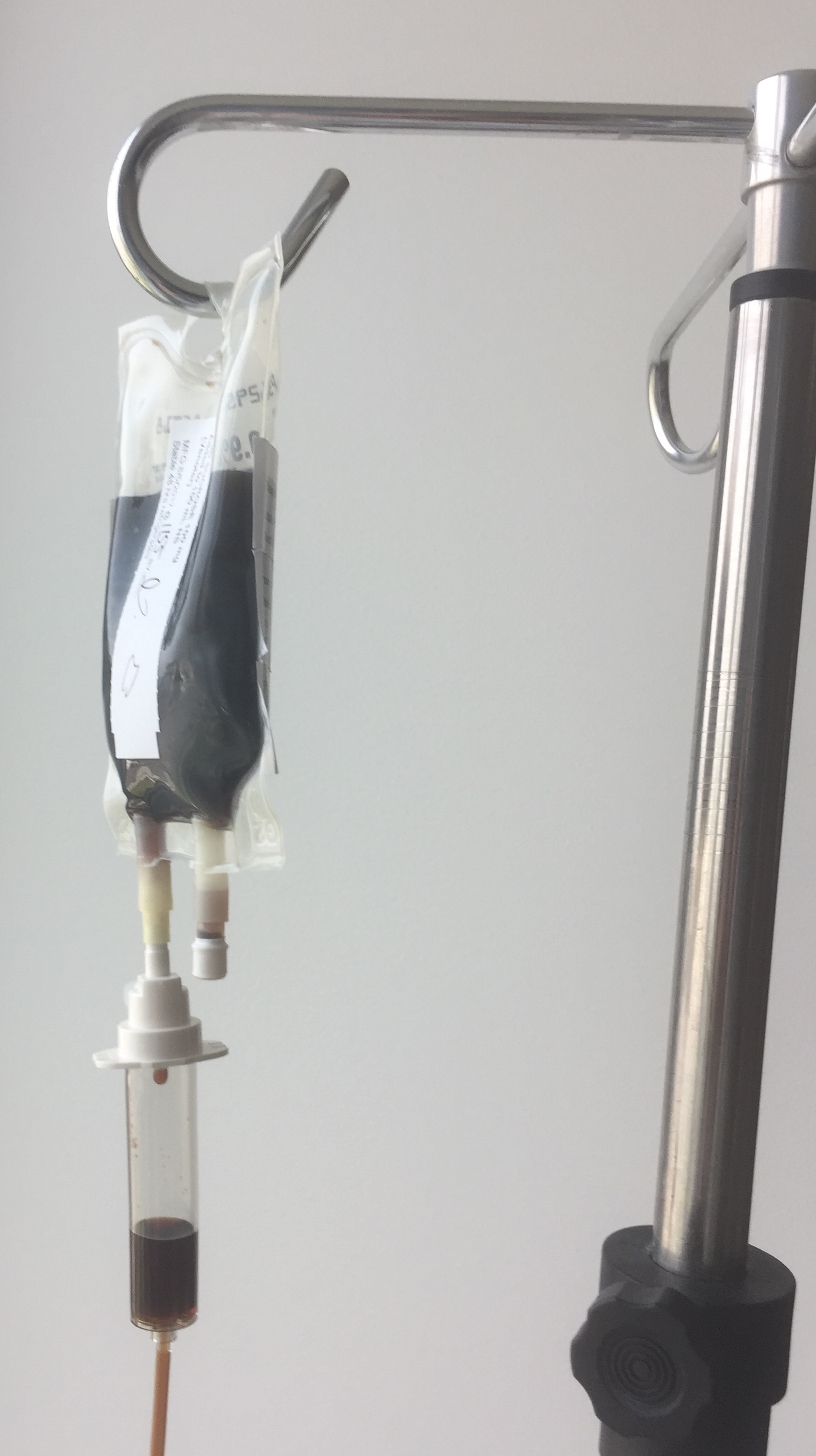
Iron Sucrose Intravenous Drip

Intravenous iron is administered directly to the bloodstream, in a form of iron carbohydrate complexes, such as iron dextran and iron sucrose. The complex is composed of a polynuclear Fe3+ hydroxide core with a surrounding carbohydrate shell. In the body, the iron complex behaves like a prodrug, releasing the iron from the Fe3+ hydroxide core via metabolism.

After the iron complex reaches the bloodstream, macrophages of the reticuloendothelial system will take up the stable complex by endocytosis. The fusion of endosomes and lysosome provides an acidic and reducing environment for iron complex cleavage. Fe2+ released is then transported by the divalent metal transporter 1(DMT1) to the macrophage cytoplasm and incorporated into ferritin.

Ferritin is temporarily stored in the macrophages as part of the iron pool in the body. Upon stimulation, iron can be transported out as ferroportin and oxidized into transferrin in the sites of action, such as the bone marrow for red blood cell synthesis or in the liver as the storage form of ferritin.

=== Role of iron in hemoglobin synthesis ===
Hemoglobin

Hemoglobin synthesis comprises globin and heme synthesis. The heme molecule is formed by the attachment of an Fe2+ ion to protoporphyrin in the bone marrow cells.

=== Elimination ===
Iron obtained from iron preparation is eliminated from the body in a similar manner as dietary iron. Iron is mostly conserved and recycled in the body with minimal loss. A very limited loss is estimated to be approximately 1 mg/day, mainly by sweating and epithelial cell exfoliation on the skin, genitourinary tract, and gastrointestinal tract. For women, menstrual bleeding is another route for iron loss.

== Iron toxicity and treatment ==
As a strong catalyst, iron is responsible for conversion of reduced forms of O2 into harmful hydroxyl radicals in the body. Excessive amount of iron leads to production of high dose of reactive oxygen species (ROS). High doses of ROS are cytotoxic and can lead to chronic and acute inflammatory conditions. Therefore, regulation of iron level with iron-binding proteins is essential such as transferrin for the transport and import of iron into cells, and ferritin for iron storage. These iron regulatory proteins prevent the accumulation of toxic cytosolic iron, maintaining a balance between uptake and storage of cellular iron.

During iron overdose, the protective mechanism is insufficient to limit the cytosolic iron concentration. The massive iron loading fails to match the capacity of ferritin for storage. The high concentration of iron emerges into the bloodstream as toxic non-transferrin-bound plasma iron(NTBI). In the worst case, high cellular iron concentration accelerates non-transferrin iron uptake, leading to accumulation of NTBI .

NTBI is cytotoxic due to its ability to promote the formation of free hydroxyl radicals, one type of ROS Such damage results in swelling and lysis of mitochondria. Iron-loaded cells deplete mitochondrial ATP content and die eventually .

Other than the mechanism of toxicity, four clinical stages of iron toxicity has been classified

The first stage is the initial stage of excess iron in intestinal system and circulation. High iron concentration causes hemorrhagic necrosis and ulceration of the upper intestine, leading to breakage of intestinal mucosal barrier and blood loss. Moreover, development of NTBI leads to circulatory collapse and reduced consciousness.

The second stage is relatively stable, with improved consciousness. The decrease in plasma iron level due to cellular uptake creates a false sense of security.

The third stage is the most dangerous phase due to intracellular iron toxicity. Iron catalyzes the mitochondrial inner membrane, resulting in peroxidative damage and upset of oxidative phosphorylation. ATP synthesis is hampered, leading to cellular dysfunction, and even death. Hypotension develops again 2 to 5 days after iron ingestion, in association with severe organ dysfunction involving mainly the liver, heart, and brain. Sudden onset of severe hepatic failure, with hypoglycemia, coagulopathy, and aggravated metabolic acidosis are likely to occur, causing fatal outcome.

The fourth stage is rarely seen as limited cases of iron poisoning can survive the third stage. Patients surviving stage 3 are likely to develop intestinal strictures or obstruction due to scarring.

Treatment of iron overdose includes gastrointestinal (GI) decontamination, chelation and supportive care. Whole-bowel irrigation can be performed with large amounts of an osmotically balanced polyethylene glycol electrolyte solution to flush out excess iron in the GI tract. In serious cases, iron chelation may be needed by intravenous injection, like deferoxamine. It binds iron and other metal ions with the chelator and is eliminated through the urine. Supportive care may also be necessary for patients with breathing difficulty and GI upset, by offering mechanical ventilation and rehydration respectively .

== Examples of iron preparation ==
=== Ferrous sulfate ===
Ferrous sulfate is widely used for both prophylaxis and treatment of iron-deficiency anemia.

In 2018, it was the 94th most commonly prescribed drug in the United States, with over eight million prescriptions.

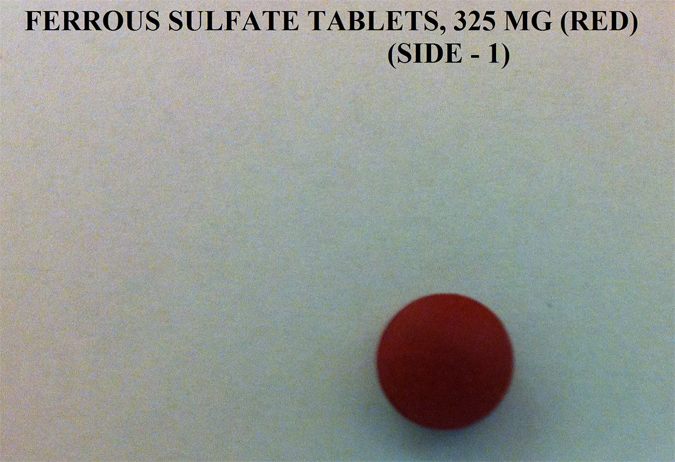
Ferrous Sulfate Tablet

Ferrous sulfate preparations
Routes	Dosage forms	Strengths	Brand names	Manufacturer
Bulk	Powder			
Oral	Solution	220 mg (44 mg iron) per 5 mL*	Ferrous Sulfate Elixir	
		300 mg (60 mg iron) per 5 mL	Ferrous Sulfate Solution	
		125 mg (25 mg iron) per mL*	Fer-Gen-Sol® Drops	Teva
			Fer-In-Sol® Drops	Mead Johnson
	Tablets	195 mg (39 mg iron)*	Mol-Iron®	Schering-Plough
		300 mg (60 mg iron)*	Feratab®	Upsher-Smith
		325 mg (65 mg iron)*		
	Tablet, enteric-coated	325 mg (65 mg iron)*	Ferrous Sulfate Tablets EC	
	Tablet, film-coated	325 mg (65 mg iron)	Ferrous Sulfate Tablets	

^{*} available from one or more manufacturer, distributor, and/or repackager by generic (nonproprietary) name

Ferrous sulfate, dried preparation
Routes	Dosage forms	Strengths	Brand Names	Manufacturer
Oral	Capsules	190 mg (60 mg iron)		
	Tablets	200 mg (65 mg iron)	Feosol®	GlaxoSmithKline
	Tablets, extended-release	160 mg (50 mg iron)	Slow FE®	Novartis

=== Ferrous gluconate ===
Ferrous gluconate is indicated for both prophylaxis and treatment of iron-deficiency anemia.

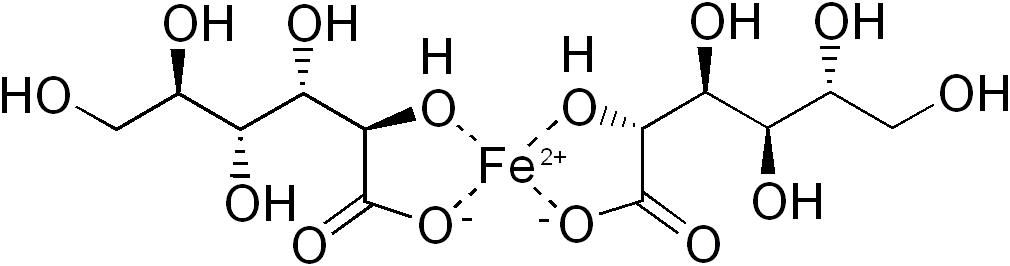
Ferrous Gluconate Structure

Ferrous gluconate preparation
Routes	Dosage forms	Strengths	Brand names	Manufacturer
Bulk	Powder			
Oral	Tablets	225 mg (27 mg iron)	Fergon®	Bayer
			Ferrous Gluconate Tablets	
		300 mg (35 mg iron)	Ferrous Gluconate Tablets	
		320 mg (37 mg iron)*		
		325 mg (38 mg iron)*		

^{*} available from one or more manufacturer, distributor, and/or repackager by generic (nonproprietary) name

=== Ferrous fumarate ===
Ferrous fumarate is used in both prophylaxis and treatment of iron-deficiency anemia.

Ferrous furmarate preparation
Routes	Dosage forms	Strengths	Brand names	Manufacturer
Oral	Tablets	200 mg (66 mg iron)	Ircon®	Kenwood
		324 mg (106 mg iron)*	Hemocyte®	US Pharmaceutical
		325 mg (107 mg iron)	Ferrous Furmurate Tablets	
		350 mg (115 mg iron)	Nephor-Fer®	R&D Labs
	Tablets, chewable	100 mg (33 mg iron)*	Feostat®	Forest

^{*} available from one or more manufacturer, distributor, and/or repackager by generic (nonproprietary) name

Ferrous fumarate combinations
Routes	Dosage Fforms	Strengths	Brand names	Manufacturer
Oral	Capsules, extended-release	150 mg (50 mg iron) with Docusate Sodium 100 mg*	Ferrous Fumarate with DSS® Timed Capsules	Vita-Rx
	Tablets, extended-release, film-coated	150 mg (50 mg iron) with Docusate Sodium 100 mg	Ferro-DSS® Caplets®	Time-Caps
			Ferro-Sequels®	Inverness

^{*} available from one or more manufacturer, distributor, and/or repackager by generic (nonproprietary) name

=== Carbonyl iron ===
Carbonyl iron is used in both prophylaxis and treatment of iron-deficiency anemia.

Carbonyl iron preparation
Routes	Dosage forms	Strengths	Brand Names	Manufacturer
Oral	Suspension	15 mg (of iron) per 1.25 mL	Icar® Pediatric	Hawthorn
	Tablets	45 mg (of iron)	Feosol® Caplets	GlaxoSmithKline
	Tablets, chewable	15 mg (of iron)	Icar® Pediatric	Hawthorn

=== Polysaccharide iron complex ===
Polysaccharide iron complex is used in both prophylaxis and treatment of iron-deficiency anemia.

Polysaccirde-iron complex preparation
Routes	Dosage Forms	Strengths	Brand names	Manufacturer
Oral	Capsules	150 mg (of iron)	Ferrex®-150	Breckenridge
			Fe-Tinic® 150	Ethex
			Hytinic®	Hyrex
			Niferex®-150	Ther-Rx
	Solution	100 mg (of iron) per 5 mL	Niferex® Elixir	Ther-Rx
	Tablets, film-coated	50 mg (of iron)	Niferex®	Ther-Rx

=== Iron sucrose ===
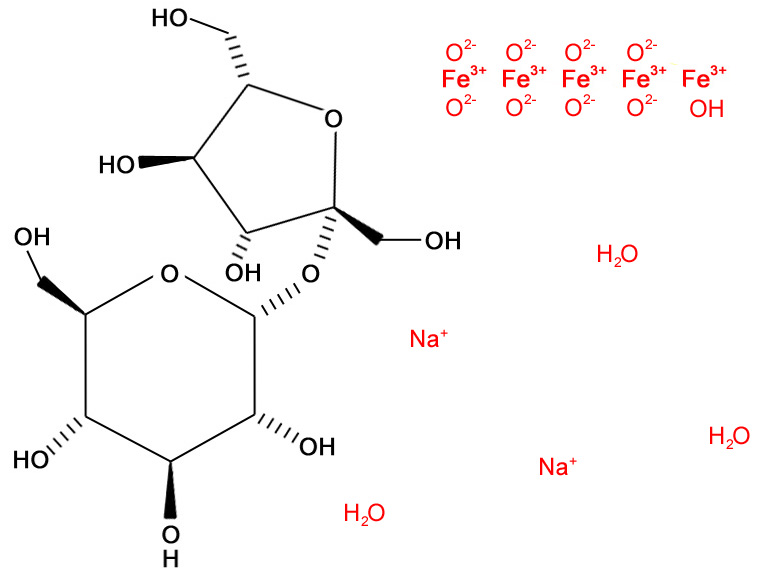
Iron Sucrose Structure

Iron sucrose is used for patients with iron-deficiency anemia, including those with chronic kidney disease, when oral iron therapy is ineffective or impractical. Iron sucrose is given by slow intravenous injection or intravenous infusion. For haemodialysis patients, it may be given into the venous limb of the dialyser.

Iron sucrose preparation
Routes	Dosage forms	Strengths	Brand names	Manufacturer
Parenteral	Injection, for IV infusion	equivalent to 20 mg of elemental iron per mL	Venofer®	American Regent

=== Iron dextran ===
Iron dextran is given by injection and should be used only in the treatment of proven iron-deficiency anemia where oral therapy is ineffective or impracticable.

Iron dextran preparation
Routes	Dosage forms	Strengths	Brand names	Manufacturer
Parenteral	Injection, for IV use	equivalent to 50 mg of elemental iron per mL	Dexferrum®	American Regent
	Injection, for IV or IM use	equivalent to 50 mg of elemental iron per mL	INFeD®	Watson

=== Haem iron polypeptide ===
Haem iron polypeptide is available in oral and parenteral dosage form. Oral formulation is used in both prophylaxis and treatment of iron-deficiency anemia.

Haem iron polypeptide preparation
Routes	Dosage forms	Strengths	Brand names	Manufacturer
Oral	Tablet	11 mg (of iron)*	Proferrin®	Colorado Biolabs
		28 mg (of iron)	Duofer®	Breckenridge
Parenteral	Injection, for IV use	equivalent to 25 mg of haem per mL*	Normosang®	Orphan
	Injection, for IV infusion	equivalent to 350 mg hemin per vial	Panhematin®	Recordati

=== Ferric pyrophosphate ===
Ferric pyrophosphate is used for hemoglobin mainatence in hemodialysis-dependent chronic kidney disease patients.

Ferric pyrophosphate preparation
Routes	Dosage forms	Strengths	Brand names	Manufacturer
Hemodialysis	Powder (for reconstitution)	272 mg of iron (III) per packet	TRIFERIC ®	Rockwell Medical
	Solution	27.2 mg of iron (III) per 5 mL ampule	TRIFERIC ®	Rockwell Medical
Parenteral	Injection, for IV use	6.75 mg iron (III) per 4.5 mL solution	TRIFERIC ®AVNU	Rockwell Medical

== See also ==
- Iron supplement
- Human iron metabolism
- Iron poisoning
