= HBH =

HBH may refer to:

- Bremerhaven Hauptbahnhof, a railway station in Germany
- H. B. Hollins (1854–1938), American financier
- Hebei Airlines
- Hemoglobin H
- Holdfast Bay Handicap, an Australian road running competition
- Team Halfords Bikehut, a British cycling team

== Also see ==
- HbH
