= Non-biological complex drugs =

Medicines that are not manufactured using biotechnology

Non-biological Complex Drugs (NBCDs) are medical compounds that cannot be defined as small molecular, fully identifiable drugs with active pharmaceutical ingredients. They are highly complex and cannot be defined as biologicals as they are not derived from living materials. NBCDs are synthetic complex compounds and they contain non-homomolecular, closely related molecular structures with often nanoparticular properties. This is, for instance, the case with the iron sucrose and its similars. But also with other drug products, e.g. polypeptides (glatiramoids), swelling polymers, liposomes as the NBCD class is growing. Hence and due to their complexity and specific composition mix, such colloidal iron carbohydrate drugs cannot be fully identified, characterized, quantitated and/or described by physiochemical means to define their pharmaceutical properties. Therefore, contradictory to the generic paradigm pathway, relying on a full pharmaceutical identity and sameness in vitro evaluation exercise, they need additional (biological, in vivo) evaluation with a reference product to assess comparability e.g. in tissue targeting in the body. This requires an appropriate, yet to be defined and be harmonized regulatory approach for these new class of medicinal products. The profile and the performance of NBCDs is defined by the multi-step manufacturing process, which is laborious, difficult to control and not disclosed by intellectual property. Minimal changes in for instance the starting materials or the process conditions might result in significant clinical differences affecting therapeutic effects or safety.

== Clinical Data ==
Studies have shown differences in therapeutic and safety effects between originator NBCDs and approved similar, even though these compounds had shown high similarities in physicochemical character. The structures responsible for these therapeutic differences are unknown. The differences in efficiency and safety (in vivo profile) cannot be detected in in-vitro testing, as it is impossible to isolate and fully characterize these compounds. Nor are there defined models for proper evaluation. Furthermore, it is unknown what to look for and what causes the differences, due to a lack of understanding of the exact composition. This calls for additional characterization in biological systems including clinical head-to-head analysis to define the extent of similarity and the place in therapy as therapeutic alternatives or interchangeable/substitutable medicinal products. Clear evidence for these observations comes from retrospective studies on iron sucrose and iron sucrose similars.

== Approval challenges for iron sucrose similars ==
NBCDs have been approved according to the classical generic paradigm based on pharmaceutical equivalence and bioequivalence without realizing the nano-properties of these types of medicinal compounds. Therefore, these compounds were seen as therapeutically equivalent. As mentioned above such an approach is not valid for follow-on versions of NBCDs. The classical generic approach disregards the complexity of NBCD compounds (pharmaceutical and biodistribution aspects) as they cannot be fully characterized in vitro, which is a prerequisite for the generic approach to predict pharmaceutical (quality) equivalence. The reason is the complexity and the non-homologous composition of these synthetic large molecular products. Even slight differences in manufacturing might result in therapeutic or safety differences not to be attributed to a known or defined component.

The existing and defined biosimilar pathway, taking into consideration the complexity of biologics and its follow-on products, is neither applicable for NBCDs and its similars. Since NBCDs are by definition not biologicals but are rather synthetic. However, basic principles can be used for an NBCD similar evaluation. Since the NBCD follow-on versions are not identical but only similar to the originator product, they are never the same as it is with generic small molecule products. NBCDs and their similars containing nanoparticulate can also be referred to as nanosimilars (see figure 1). A stepwise quality, non-clinical and clinical approach is suggested for market approval of NBCD nanosimilars and to show comparability. There is a lack of non-clinical models to test such products like e.g. the rodent approach addressed by EMA in their reference paper for the NBCDs iron sucrose and its similars. Recently, the hatching egg model was used as an alternative model to study time-dependent iron concentrations in heart and liver avian tissues for various intravenous iron complexes applied in equimolar doses. Such models need in-depth evaluation and validation to demonstrate robustness and to further define potential use in an evaluation and comparison testing. When evaluated similar enough, the challenge then still is to define to either use them as a therapeutic alternative or as an equivalent product and if at the end the follow-on version can substitute the reference product or can be interchanged which also needs head-to-head comparisons in patients to prove therapeutic equivalence and comparable safety.

Both the European Medicines Agency (EMA) and the US Food and Drug Administration (US FDA) have drafted reference papers and guidance’s for the industry for several types of NBCDs, e.g. for iron nanoparticles products. Also regulatory science initiatives have addressed lacking investigations. For the comparability exercise the question stays to evaluate the totality of evidence for enough similarity of such test drugs with the reference product to conclude of the extent of comparability and its impact on use. Currently, the FDA follows a case-by-case approach for the evaluation of NBCD follow-on products, which is iterative, adaptive and flexible but also more general. The EMA on the other hand is supporting a class-related approach including non-clinical testing. A harmonized approach is, however, still missing.
