= Haem carrier protein 1 =

Putative type VI secretion protein

Identifiers
- Organism: Escherichia coli str. 042
- Symbol: EC042_4529
- Alt. symbols: HCP1
- Entrez: 12885448
- PDB: 4HKH
- RefSeq (Prot): WP_001007313.1
- UniProt: D3GUW0

Other data
- Chromosome: Genomic: 4.86 - 4.86 Mb
Search for
- Structures: Swiss-model
- Domains: InterPro

Haem or Heme carrier protein 1 (HCP1) is a protein found in the small intestine that plays a role in the absorption of dietary heme, a form of iron that is only found in animal products. It was originally identified as mediating heme-Fe transport although it later emerged that this was mediated by the SLC46A1 folate transporter.

Heme is a component of many proteins, including hemoglobin, which carries oxygen in the blood. HCP1 is a transmembrane protein expressed in the brush-border membrane of the small intestine, where it binds to heme and transports it into the enterocyte. It is the only known heme transporter expressed in the small intestine.

HCP1 is particularly important in situations where dietary iron intake is low, as it allows for the efficient absorption of heme iron. HCP1 is also expressed in other tissues, including the liver and bone marrow, where it may play a role in the uptake of heme for the production of heme-containing proteins. Dysfunction of HCP1 has been associated with a range of conditions, including iron-deficiency anemia and certain types of cancer.

== History ==
HCP1 is also known as proton-coupled folate transporter (PCFT), as it was initially identified as a transporter for folate, a type of vitamin B. However, subsequent studies revealed that HCP1 primarily functions as a heme transporter in the small intestine.

== Properties ==
HCP1 is a type of transmembrane protein that spans the membrane of the enterocyte in the small intestine. It has a large extracellular domain that binds to heme, as well as a smaller intracellular domain that interacts with protons to drive heme uptake. The body more easily absorbs heme iron than non-heme iron, which is found in plant-based foods. This is because heme iron is more bioavailable, meaning that the body can absorb and use it more efficiently. HCP1 plays a key role in the absorption of heme iron in the small intestine, particularly in situations where dietary iron intake is low.

HCP1 expression is regulated by a number of factors, including iron status, dietary heme intake, and inflammation. Studies have shown that HCP1 expression is upregulated in response to low iron levels and decreased when iron levels are sufficient.

== Pathogenesis ==
Dysfunction of HCP1 has been associated with a range of conditions, including iron-deficiency anemia, thalassemia, certain types of cancer, and porphyria. HCP1 has also been implicated in the pathogenesis of certain types of cancer, including colorectal cancer and pancreatic cancer. HCP1 is a promising target for the development of drugs that can modulate heme uptake and metabolism. Inhibitors of HCP1 have been developed as potential treatments for cancer, while activators of HCP1 may have therapeutic potential in the treatment of iron-deficiency anemia.

== Structure ==
The structure of HCP1 is complex and involves interactions between multiple domains and regions of the protein. HCP1 is a transmembrane protein, a type of protein that spans the cell membrane with parts of it located both inside and outside of the cell. Spanning the membrane allows it to transport heme across the cell membrane. HCP1 has a large extracellular domain that binds to heme with high affinity. This binding enables HCP1 to transport heme into the enterocyte in the small intestine.

HCP1 is a proton-coupled transporter meaning that HCP1 relies on a proton gradient across the cell membrane to transport heme into the enterocyte. The proton gradient uses the energy of protons to move heme across the cell membrane. HCP1 is primarily expressed in the small intestine, where it plays a key role in heme absorption. In other tissues, such as the liver and bone marrow it may be involved in heme metabolism. HCP1 expression is upregulated in response to low iron levels and downregulated when iron levels are sufficient. This regulation allows for efficient heme absorption in times of low iron intake.

== Solubility ==
Haem Carrier Protein 1 (HCP1) is a membrane-bound protein that is embedded in the cell membrane. As such, it is not freely soluble in aqueous solutions like water. However, like other membrane proteins, using detergents, HCP1 can be solubilized and extracted from the cell membrane. Detergents are amphipathic molecules that have both hydrophobic and hydrophilic regions and can interact with both the membrane lipids and the protein molecules to solubilize them. The solubilization of HCP1 from the membrane requires careful selection of a suitable detergent and optimization of the conditions to preserve the protein's stability and activity. Common detergents used for the solubilization of membrane proteins include Triton X-100, dodecyl maltoside (DDM), and n-dodecyl-β-D-maltopyranoside (DDM). Once solubilized, HCP1 can be purified using various techniques, including chromatography and ultracentrifugation, to obtain a highly purified and homogeneous protein sample for further study. The solubility and stability of HCP1 can be affected by various factors, including pH, temperature, ionic strength, and the presence of other molecules or ligands that interact with the protein. some studies suggest that L-arginine can upregulate the expression of HCP-1, which may increase the uptake of cationic amino acids such as L-arginine in various cell types.

== See also ==
HCP1 is identical to the proton-coupled folate transporter (PCFT-SLC46A1).

HCP1 is related to the Reduced Folate Carrier (RFC) SLC19A1.
