= Hemoglobin H disease =

- Other names: α-thalassemia intermedia
- Specialty: Hematology

Hemoglobin H disease, also called α-thalassemia intermedia, is a disease affecting hemoglobin, the oxygen carrying molecule within red blood cells. It is a form of α-thalassemia which most commonly occurs due to deletion of 3 out of 4 of the α-globin genes.

== Pathophysiology ==
Hemoglobin H disease is a genetic disorder resulting in absent or impaired production of the α-globin protein, a normal component of the hemoglobin. The disease occurs when the α-globin gene expression is reduced to less than 30% of the normal expression. In a healthy individual there are four copies of the gene which encode the α-globin protein. α-globin is encoded by the HBA1 (2 copies) and HBA2 (2 copies) genes. The genotype of healthy individuals with four normal copies of α-globin is annotated as αα/αα. In individuals with deletional HbH disease, there is deletion of three of the four α-globin alleles, which is annotated as --/-α. Non-deletional HbH disease refers to a decreased α-globin that has not occurred as a result of the complete deletion of the DNA sequences encoding HBA1 and HBA2, and this is more rare than the deletional type.

The most common hemoglobin found within adult red blood cells is hemoglobin A. The structure of HbA consists of two α-globin chains bound to two β-globin chains to form a tetramer (a protein made up four protein chains). When there is lower than normal production of α-globin, as in HbH disease, the excess β-globin form β4-tetramers, termed hemoglobin H. These β4-tetramers accumulate in red blood cells and precipitate to form HbH inclusion bodies. The inclusion bodies in the mature red blood cells are removed by the spleen and this results in an early destruction of these red blood cells. This destruction of red blood cells by the spleen is termed extravascular hemolysis. Hemoglobin F is the predominant form in the fetus and it also contains α-globin, thus, in severe cases the disease can affect fetal development.

== Epidemiology ==
The prevalence of hemoglobin H disease mirrors that of the hemoglobinopathies. As a whole, they are most prevalent in individuals of Asian, African, and Mediterranean decent. There is a protective effect against malaria for individuals carrying thalassemia genes, which explains the high frequency of thalassemia within the worldwide population.

== Clinical presentation ==
Patients with hemoglobin H disease present with chronic hemolytic anemia that ranges in severity from mild to moderate disease. Anemia is the most common presenting symptom of patients with HbH disease. Other common clinical features include jaundice, splenomegaly, hepatomegaly, and gallstones. All of these symptoms are related to the destruction of the red blood cells in the spleen and the associated increased hemoglobin metabolism. Patients with non-deletional HbH disease are more likely to be symptomatic and have severe disease presentation when compared to individuals with deletional HbH disease. Disease presentation varies from asymptomatic individuals to neonatal growth retardation and death in the most severe cases. Death in the neonatal period occurs due to the severe anemia resulting in hydrops fetalis.

Patients most often present initially due to hemolytic episodes that occur during times of infection or inflammation. During these episodes, patients may develop hemolytic crisis, in which there is a rapid drop in the hemoglobin due to increased red blood cell destruction.

== Diagnosis ==
Hemoglobin analysis, with tests such as high-performance liquid chromatography, along with genetic testing are required for the confirmation of HbH disease. Patients may also laboratory abnormalities indicative of low red blood cells, including changes in hemoglobin, red cell distribution width, hematocrit, mean corpuscular hemoglobin, and mean corpuscular volume. A peripheral blood smear stained with brilliant cresyl blue will show inclusion bodies within the red blood cells.

== Treatment ==
Due to the fact that HbH disease does not commonly present with severe anemia, all patients do not require treatment or intervention. Some patients may require folic acid supplementation due to the increased turnover of red blood cells. In cases of hemolytic crisis, patients are treated with a blood transfusion and treatment of the underlying cause. In severe cases, regular blood transfuions may be needed, and these patients should be monitored for development of iron overload. For these severe cases, stem cell transplantation can be curative.

== See also ==
- Hemoglobin Barts
- Beta thalassemia
- ATR-X syndrome
