= Hemoglobin Barts =

Abnormal type of hemoglobin that consists of four gamma globins

Hemoglobin Barts, abbreviated Hb Barts, is an abnormal type of hemoglobin that consists of four gamma globins. It is moderately insoluble, and therefore accumulates in the red blood cells. Hb Barts has an extremely high affinity for oxygen, so it cannot release oxygen to the tissue. Therefore, this makes it an inefficient oxygen carrier. As an embryo develops, it begins to produce alpha-globins at weeks 5–6 of development. When both of the HBA1 and HBA2 genes which code for alpha globins becomes dysfunctional, the affected fetuses will have difficulty in synthesizing a functional hemoglobin. As a result, gamma chains will accumulate and form four gamma globins. These gamma globins bind to form hemoglobin Barts. It is produced in the disease alpha-thalassemia and in the most severe of cases, it is the only form of hemoglobin in circulation. In this situation, a fetus will develop hydrops fetalis and normally die before or shortly after birth, unless intrauterine blood transfusion is performed.

Since hemoglobin Barts is elevated in alpha thalassemia, it can be measured, providing a useful screening test for this disease in some populations.

The ability to measure hemoglobin Barts makes it useful in newborn screening tests. If hemoglobin Barts is detected on a newborn screen, the patient is usually referred for further evaluation since detection of hemoglobin Barts can indicate either one alpha globin gene deletion, making the baby a silent alpha thalassemia carrier, two alpha globin gene deletions (alpha thalassemia), or hemoglobin H disease (three alpha globin gene deletions). Deletion of four alpha globin genes was previously felt to be incompatible with life, but there are currently 69 patients who have survived past infancy.

Genotypes	Alpha-Globin Gene Deletions	Clinical Component
αα/αα	0	Normal
-α/αα	1	Silent Carrier
--/αα or -α/-α	2	Alpha-Thalassemia Trait
--/-α	3	Hb H Disease
--/--	4	Fetal Hydrops

Table 1: α represents the presence of α-globin gene and- represents the deletion of α-globin gene.

The chance of a fetus developing Hemoglobin Barts hydrops fetalis is dependent upon if one or both parent carries the alpha-thalassemia trait. Due to this disease being incompatible with life, diagnosis for it is done prenatally. Early detection of Hemoglobin (Hb) Bart's disease before the development of hydrops fetalis is crucial because fetuses that develop hydrops fetalis will either be stillborn or may die shortly after birth. There can be early pregnancy termination to prevent serious complications for the baby or mother. Studies shows that in 11 to 14 weeks of gestation, sonographic markers can associate affected from unaffected pregnancies. It was found that the most sensitive marker was CT ratio and MCA‐PSV.

Parents at risk of having a child with fetal hydrops can continue their pregnancy with regular ultrasounds and intrauterine blood transfusion. Babies of such parents are born with no edema or major neurological defects, and eventually, this disease can be cured with haematopoietic stem cell transplantation. A newly developed diagnostic test, called Immunochromatography (IC) Strip Tests, uses monoclonal antibodies to detect Hemoglobin Barts in red blood cells' lysate. This diagnostic test is validated for positive and negative predictive values. It is also cheap and easy, making regular screening for alpha-thalassemia a plausible possibility.

Anemia is a factor in fetuses with Hemoglobin Barts disease as there is an "increased cardiac output" and hypovolemia as the tissues of the fetus require additional oxygen because of the gamma globulin's high affinity for oxygen. This deprives the tissues of receiving oxygen to function well. The symptoms of anemia occur within the first trimester.

This variant of hemoglobin is so called as it was discovered at St Bartholomew's Hospital in London, often abbreviated to Barts.
