= Iron-binding proteins =

Carrier proteins

Iron-binding proteins are carrier proteins and metalloproteins that are important in iron metabolism and the immune response. Iron is required for life.

Iron-dependent enzymes catalyze a variety of biochemical reactions and can be divided into three broad classes depending on the structure of their active site: non-heme mono-iron, non-heme diiron, or heme centers. A well-known family of iron-dependent enzymes include oxygenases that facilitate hydroxyl group addition of one or both atoms from o_{2}. Notable enzymes include tryptophan dioxygenase, ferredoxin, and 2-oxoglutarate dioxygenase.

== Heme proteins ==
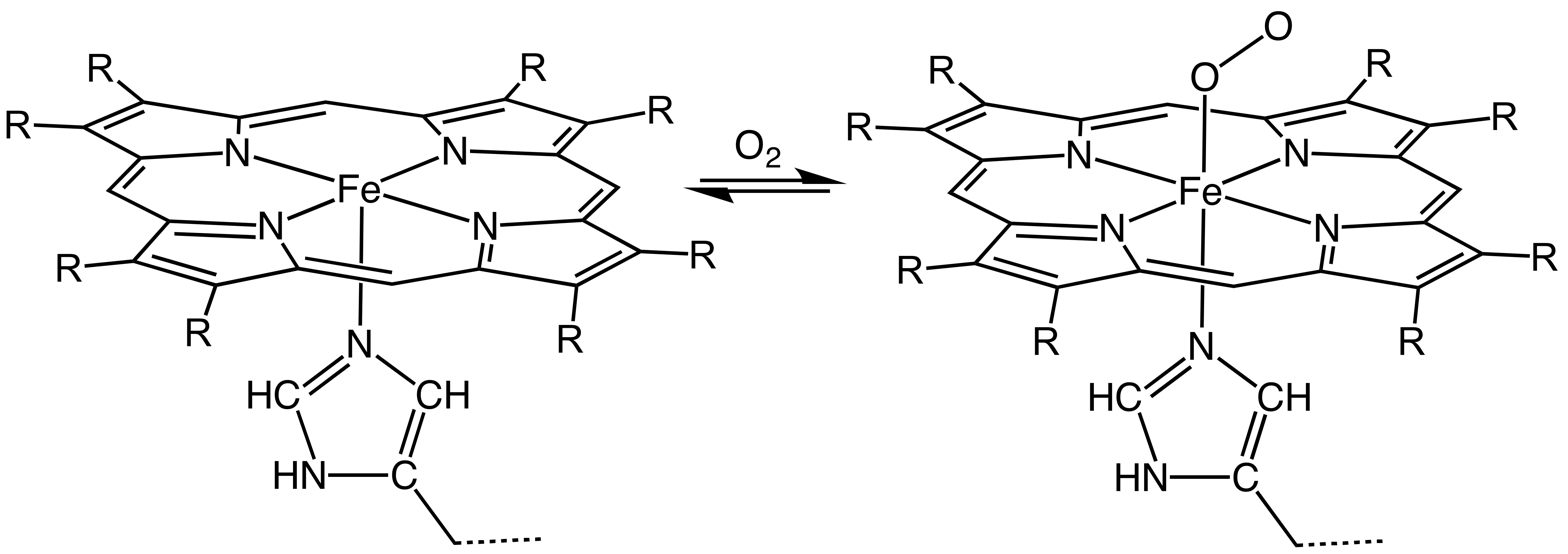
The heme group uses four equatorial ligands in the porphyrin ring, with the two axial ligands being the histidine side chain and molecular oxygen.

Heme proteins are proteins that contain a heme prosthetic group. The heme group consists of a porphyrin ring coordinated with an iron ion. Four nitrogen atoms in the porphyrin ring act as a ligand for the iron in the center. In many cases, the equatorial porphyrin is complemented by one or two axial ligands. An example of this is in hemoglobin, where the porphyrin works together with a histidine side chain and a bound O_{2} molecule, forming an octahedral complex.

=== Hemoglobin ===
A visual depiction of the conformational change undergone by hemoglobin upon oxygen binding.

Hemoglobin is an oxygen-transport protein found in virtually all vertebrates. Hemoglobin A is the main type found in human adults. It is a tetramer consisting of two alpha and two beta subunits. Each of the four monomeric units contain a heme prosthetic group in which a ferric cation is bound between four nitrogen atoms of a porphyrin ring. Along with a histidine, the apo form has five ligands surrounding the iron atom. Oxygen binds to the empty sixth position to form an octahedral complex in the holo form. Oxygen binding is fully cooperative for each of the subunits because as the first oxygen binds to one of the four heme groups, the protein undergoes a drastic conformational change that sharply increases the oxygen affinity of the other three subunits.

Hemoglobin has various affinities, depending on pH, structure, and CO_{2} partial pressure. Fetal hemoglobin is a variant containing two gamma subunits instead of two beta subunits. Fetal hemoglobin is the predominant form up until the infant is several months old, and it has a greater oxygen affinity to compensate for the low oxygen tension of supplied maternal blood during pregnancy. Hemoglobin has a lower oxygen affinity at low pH. This allows for rapid dissociation as oxygenated hemoglobin is transported to cells throughout the body. Because of the CO_{2} production and aqueous formation of carbonic acid in respiring cells, oxygenated hemoglobin dissociates in order to deliver the necessary oxygen to the cells. Hemoglobin has a binding affinity for carbon monoxide that is 250 times greater than for oxygen. This is the basis of carbon monoxide poisoning, as hemoglobin can no longer transport oxygen to cells.

=== Cytochromes ===
Cytochromes are heme-containing enzymes that act as single-electron transporters, most notably as electron shuttles in oxidative phosphorylation and photosynthesis. Types of well-studied cytochromes include cytochromes a-c, cytochrome oxidase, and cytochrome P450. These proteins act as electron shuttles by switching the oxidation state of the heme iron atom between ferrous (Fe^{2+}) and ferric (Fe^{3+}). Various cytochromes in combination with other redox-active molecules form a gradient of standard reduction potentials that increases the efficiency of energy coupling during electron-transfer events.

== Iron-sulfur proteins ==
Iron-sulfur proteins are those with an iron structure that includes sulfur. There are a variety of forms iron and sulfur can take in proteins, but the most common are [2Fe 2S] and [4Fe 4S]. Clusters are often associated with cysteine residues in the protein chain.

== Non-heme proteins ==
=== Transferrin ===
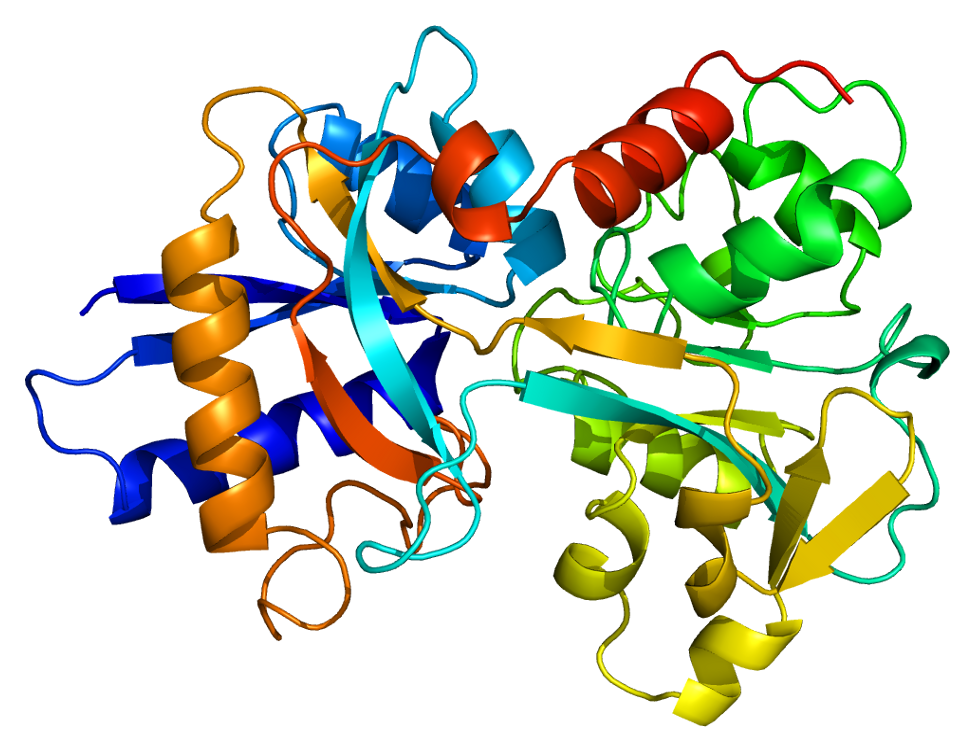
Structure visualization of human serum transferrin.

Transferrin is found in human plasma, and it is used to traffic and import non-heme iron. It travels freely in the extracellular space. When its iron is needed by the cell, it is brought into the cytosol by a transferrin receptor. Transferrin can bind two Fe(III) ions, along with an anion (usually carbonate). To release the iron, the carbonate anion is protonated. This changes the carbonate's interaction with the protein, changing the conformation and allowing Fe(III) to be transferred.

Transferrin has a molecular weight of about 80 kDa. It is a glycoprotein, meaning that it has sugars attached to its amino acid chain.

=== Lactoferrin ===
Lactoferrin is a member of the transferrin family and is the predominant protein found in mammal exocrine secretions, such as tears, milk, and saliva. It is composed of approximately 700 residues and exists mainly as a tetramer, with the monomer:tetramer ratio being 1:4 at 10 μM protein concentrations. The tertiary structure is composed of two lobes, termed N and C lobes, each containing one iron-binding pocket. Each pocket contributes four amino acids (two tyrosines, one histidine, and one aspartate) and, along with two carbonate or bicarbonate anions, forms a six-membered coordinate around the iron cation. It is this specific combination that makes lactoferrin's iron affinity 300 times greater than transferrin.

Depiction of lactoferrin (left) competitively binding iron over an E. coli siderophore (right).

Lactoferrin has significant antimicrobial properties. It is found in the highest concentration of 150 ng/mL in human colostrum (the type of milk produced at the end stages of pregnancy), providing much needed immune support to newly born infants. It was widely believed that lactoferrin was only a bacteriostatic agent due to its high iron affinity and its ability to sequester free iron atoms from pathogenic microbes. It is now known, however, that the major antimicrobial driving force lies in the bactericidal properties of its iron-bound pocket and a specific peptide lactoferricin located at the N-lobe. Lactoferrin is able to bind to the LPS (lipopolysaccharide) layer of bacteria, and in its holo form the iron atom oxidizes the lipopolysaccharides to lyse the outer membrane and simultaneously produce toxic hydrogen peroxide. Additionally, upon cleavage of lactoferrin by trypsin, the peptide lactoferricin is produced which binds to H^{+}-ATPase, disrupting proton translocation and ultimately killing the cell.

=== Ferritin ===
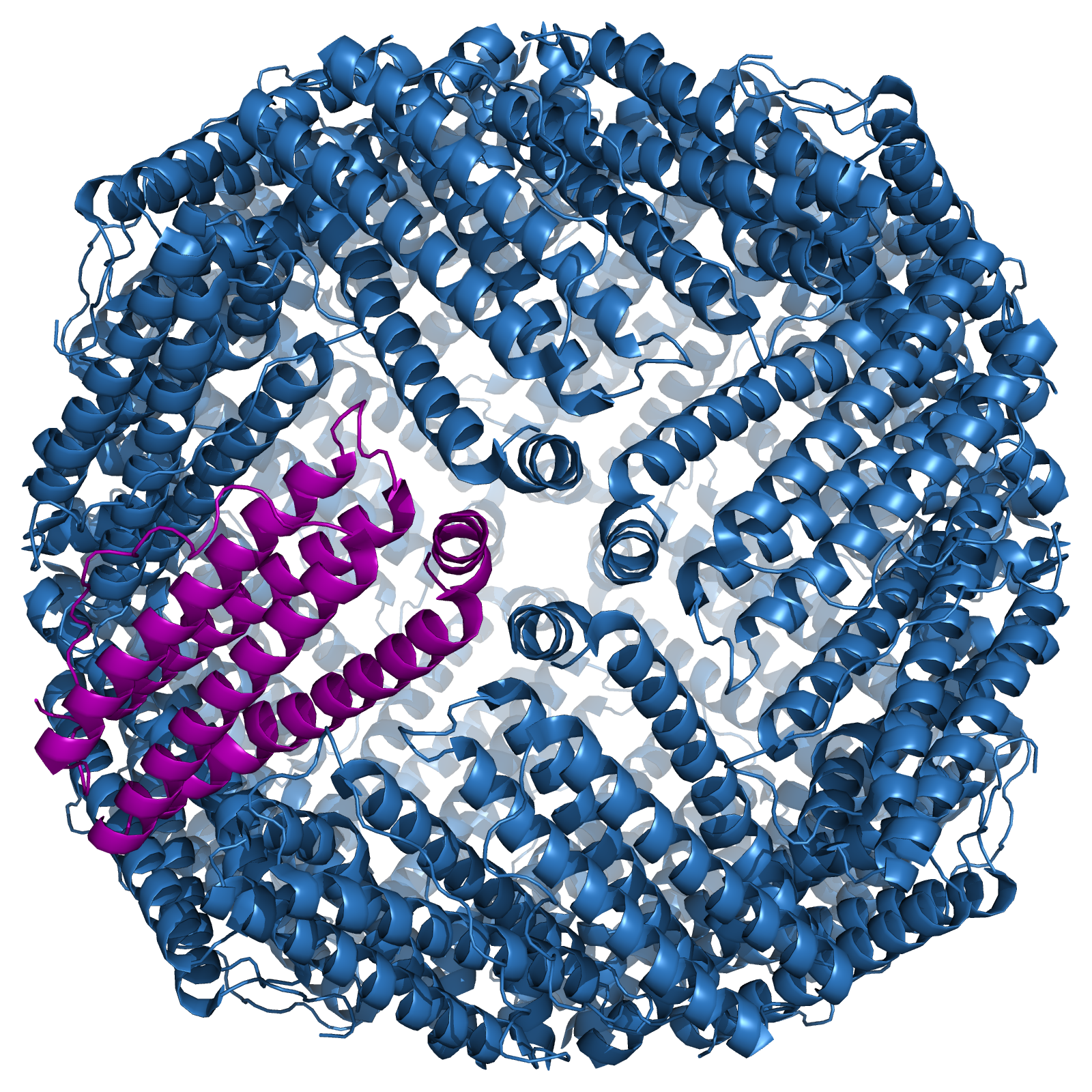
Protein structure of fully assembled ferritin. A single subunit is colored in purple.

Ferritin is an iron reservoir for an individual cell. It is found in all cells types and localized in the cytosol. Ferritin is a large protein composed of 24 subunits surrounding a core full of iron atoms. It is capable of holding 0-4500 iron atoms, which can be used as a reservoir for cellular needs. Iron is stored when there is excess, and retrieved when iron is needed again. The subunits are a mixture of H (heavy or heart) and L (light or liver). The subunits form a cluster 70-80 Angstroms wide, which is then filled with iron ferrihydrite.

Ferritin is a highly conserved protein through all domains of life. It is so conserved that subunits from horses and humans can assemble together into a functional protein. Each subunit is composed of five alpha helices.

Ferritin is used to diagnose low iron levels in humans. It can be used to indicate the level of bioavailable iron, which is helpful for diagnosing anemia. The usual range for men is 18-270 ng/mL and the range for women is 18-160 ng/mL.

== See also ==
- Iron
