= Hemoglobin O =

Hemoglobin O (HbO) is a rare type of hemoglobin in which there is a substitution of glutamic acid by lysine as in hemoglobin C, but at different positions. Since the amino acid substitution can occur at different positions of the β-globin chain of the protein, there are several variants. In hemoglobin O-Arab (HbO-Arab) substitution occurs at position 121, while in hemoglobin O-Padova (HbO-Padova) it is at 11 position, and in hemoglobin O Indonesia (HbO_{Ina}) it is at 116.

HbO is usually harmless unlike other hemoglobin variants such as HbS and thalassemias, even under combination with these abnormal hemoglobins. Hemoglobin O-Padova is the most severe form and is associated with disease of the RBCs and spleen.

== Discovery ==
Hemoglobin O Indonesia is the first discovered HbO. Lie-Injo Luan Eng at the University of Indonesia, Djakarta, was the first to notice the abnormal hemoglobin in 1956 among the Buginese people of Sulawesi Island in Indonesia. It was found among normal hemoblobin (HbA) of the blood samples but different under electrophoresis. It also showed different characters form HbS and HbC, and did not cause sickling of RBCs. The discovery went unnoticed as he later remarked, "This report, however, did not attract any attention as it was written in the Indonesian language." He again reported his observation in The Lancet the next year. After consulting Hermann Lehmann at the St Bartholomew's Hospital in London and T.H.J. Huisman at the State University of Groningen in the Netherlands, and letting experimentally verified by Harvey Itano at the California Institute of Technology, he was convinced that his discovery was a new type of hemoglobin. He gave the name "hemoglobin Buginese X" as he reported in The British Medical Journal in 1958, concluding:

As it has been confirmed by different laboratories that Buginese X differs from all other known haemoglobins, it should be allotted a letter. N was the letter most recently used to designate haemoglobin Liberian I (personal communication by Dr. James V. Neel). So far as we know, the letter 0 has not yet been used, and therefore Buginese X should be called Hb 0. Dr. James V. Neel agreed with this choice.

The same hemoglobin type was found in Iran in 1973. It was found that the protein modification was at position 116 where lysine was present in place of glutamic acid. In 1978, a similar case was reported from Italy. The hemoglobin was eventually named hemoglobin O Indonesia.

In 1960, a different but related hemoglobin was found from an 8-year-old Arab boy at Jisr az-Zarqa in Israel. As the boy had severe pneumonia and blood abnormality (hemoglobinopathy) including sickled RBCs. His Hemoglobin was different from HbC and HbS and was designated as hemoglobin O (HbO). On investigating his family, his father was found to be the HbO carrier (i.e. heterozygous HbA/HbO) while her mother HbS carrier. Out of the six siblings, three had no HbO (though one has HbS), one had a heterozygous HbO. The boy and his older sister were diagnosed with sickle cell disease due to inherited HbS/HbO combination. It was later found that the amino acid replacement is at position 121 of the hemoglobin. The hemoglobin is now known as hemoglobin O-Arab.

In 1974, another abnormal hemoglobin which they called hemoglobin O-Padova was identified from an Italian woman in Padova. It showed glutamic acid to lysine substitution at position 11. The woman was suffering from a complicated blood conditions. The mother and one of the two children indicated the same hemoglobin but without any symptom.

== Disease ==
Hemoglobin O Indonesia is mostly harmless. But some individuals may indicate mild anemia. Even under heterozygous condition such as with HbD, no serious symptom is observed. With HbS, there can be mild sickle cell trait but no symptoms.

Hemoglobin O-Arab causes sickle cell disease in heterozygous (HbS/HbO) individuals. However, the symptomatic anemia is mild and is not life-threatening. It is even milder than in heterozygous sickle cell trait (HbS/HbA). A case of sickle cell retinopathy is documented. Under homozygous condition, it is also linked with jaundice (conjugated hyperbilirubinemia), and mild anemia.

Hemoglobin O-Padova in homozygous condition is associated with complex genetic and physiological anomalies. In the first woman diagnosed, severe RBC damage (dyserythropoietic anemia), enlargement of spleen (splenomegaly), and abnormal RBC (hereditary erythroblastic multinuclearity). But heterozygous condition is clinically harmless.
