= Hemoglobin Constant Spring =

Hemoglobin variant

Hemoglobin Constant Spring is a variant of hemoglobin in which a mutation in the alpha globin gene produces an alpha globin chain that is abnormally long. It is the most common nondeletional alpha-thalassemia mutation associated with hemoglobin H disease. The quantity of hemoglobin in the cells is low because the messenger RNA is unstable and some is degraded prior to protein synthesis. Another reason is that the Constant Spring alpha chain protein is itself unstable. The result is a thalassemic phenotype.

Hemoglobin Constant Spring is renamed after Constant Spring district in Jamaica.

== See also ==
- Hemoglobin variants
- Hemoglobinopathy
- Thalassemia
