= Hemoglobin variants =

Forms of hemoglobin caused by variations in genetics

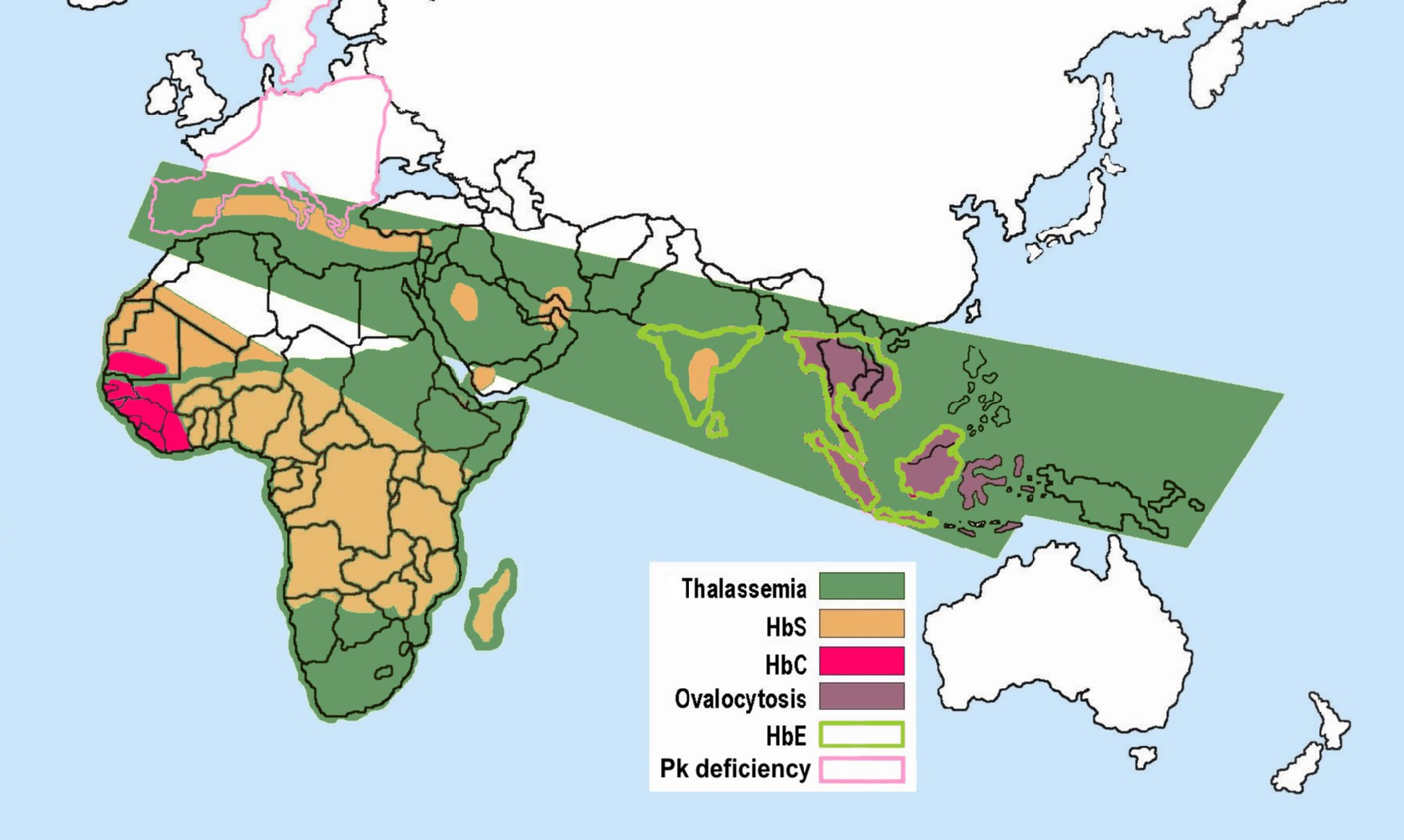
Global distribution of red blood cell abnormalities

Hemoglobin is a protein that transports oxygen in the blood. Genetic differences lead to structural variants in the hemoglobin protein structure. Some variants can cause disease while others have little to no effect.

The normal hemoglobin types are Hemoglobin A (HbA), which makes up 95–98% of total hemoglobin in adults, Hemoglobin A2 (HbA2), which constitutes 2–3% of total hemoglobin in adults, and Hemoglobin F (HbF), which is the predominant hemoglobin in the fetus during pregnancy, and may persist in small amounts in adults.

Hemoglobin variants occur when there are mutations in specific genes that code for the protein chains, known as globins, which make up the hemoglobin molecule. This leads to amino acid substitutions in the hemoglobin molecule that could affect the structure, properties, and/or the stability of the hemoglobin molecule. There are over 1,000 known mutations in the genes coding for hemoglobin in humans.

== Effects of variants ==
The physiological effects of these variants can range from minor to severe. Mutations can caused impaired production of hemoglobin (thalassemia) or produce structurally altered hemoglobins. Some hemoglobin variants, such as HbS which causes sickle-cell anemia, are responsible for severe diseases and are considered hemoglobinopathies. Other variants cause no detectable pathology, and are thus considered non-pathological variants.

== Discovery of variants ==
Hemoglobin variants can be discovered through examination, routine laboratory testing, or evaluation of patients with severe anemia. In some countries, all newborns are tested for hemoglobinopathies, thalassemias, and HbS. Isoelectric focusing or high-performance liquid chromatography are used to identify structural abnormalities in hemoglobin.

== Examples of variants ==
Over 1,000 known mutations can lead to thalassaemia or hemoglobin variants. A research database of hemoglobin variants is maintained by Penn State University. A few of these variants are listed below.

=== Normal hemoglobins ===
Embryonic

- HbE Gower 1 (ζ_{2}ε_{2})
- HbE Gower 2 (α_{2}ε_{2})
- HbE Portland I (ζ_{2}γ_{2})
- HbE Portland II (ζ_{2}β_{2})
- HbE Portland III (ζ_{2}δ_{2})

Fetal

- HbF/Fetal (α_{2}γ_{2})
- HbA (α_{2}β_{2})

Adult

- HbA (α_{2}β_{2})
- HbA_{2} (α_{2}δ_{2})
- HbF/Fetal (α_{2}γ_{2})

=== Pathologic/abnormal hemoglobins ===
==== Relatively common ====
- HbS (α_{2}β^{S}_{2})
- HbC (α_{2}β^{C}_{2})
- HbE (α_{2}β^{E}_{2})

==== Less frequent ====
- Hb H (β_{4})
- Hb Barts (γ_{4})
- Hb O (α_{2}β^{O}_{2})
- Hb Bassett
- Hb Kansas
- Hb D-Punjab
- Hb O-Arab
- Hb G-Philadelphia
- Hb Hasharon
- Hb Kirklareli
- Hb Lepore
- Hb M
- Hb Hope
- Hb Pisa
- Hb J
- Hb N-Baltimore
- Hemoglobin Chesapeake
- Hemoglobin Louisville
- Hemoglobin Vanvitelli
