= Codocyte =

Type of red blood cell

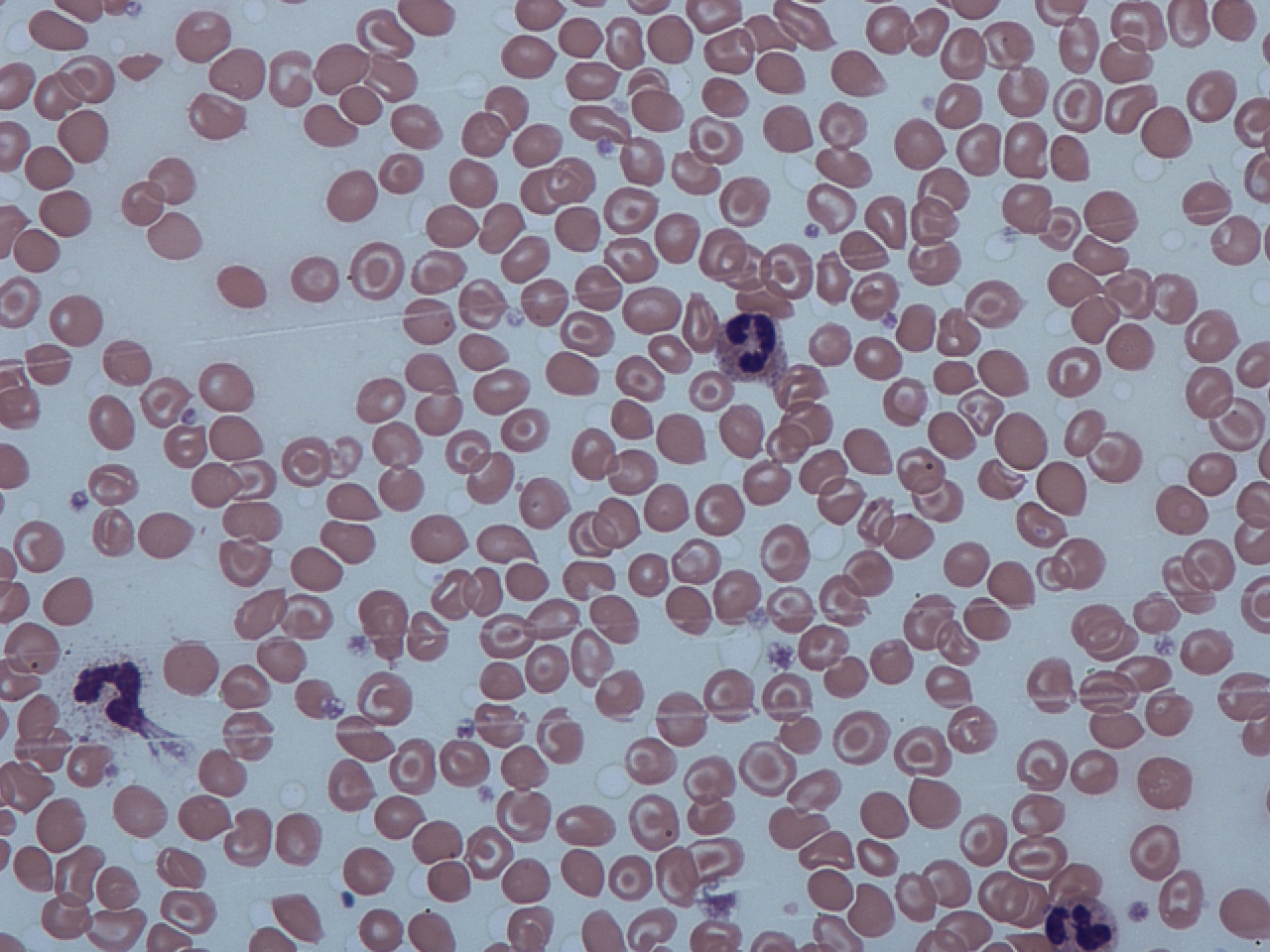
Codocytes in human blood (Giemsa stain)

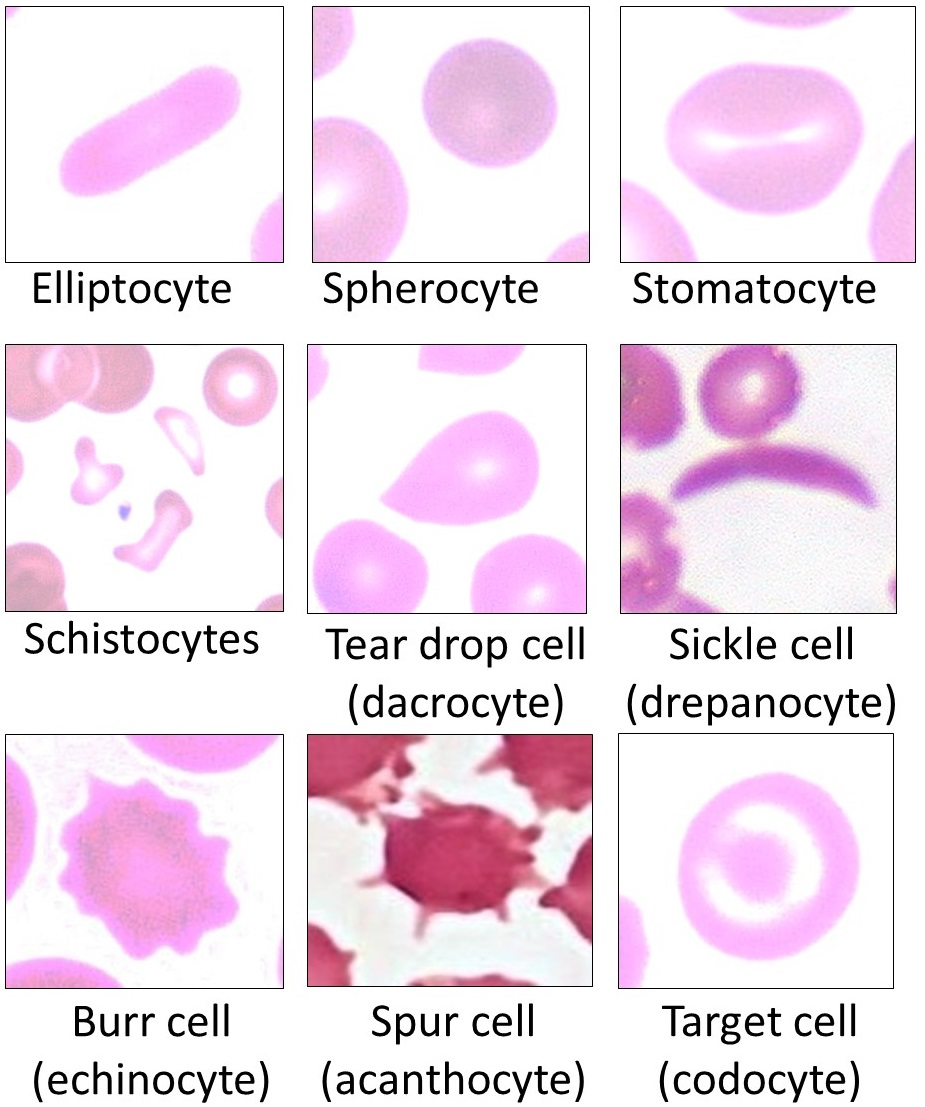
Target cell compared to other forms of poikilocytosis.

Codocytes, also known as target cells, are red blood cells that have the appearance of a shooting target with a bullseye. In optical microscopy these cells appear to have a dark center (a central, hemoglobinized area) surrounded by a white ring (an area of relative pallor), followed by dark outer (peripheral) second ring containing a band of hemoglobin. However, in electron microscopy they appear very thin and bell shaped (hence the name codo-: bell). Because of their thinness they are referred to as leptocytes. On routine smear morphology, some people like to make a distinction between leptocytes and codocytes- suggesting that in leptocytes the central spot is not completely detached from the peripheral ring, i.e. the pallor is in a C shape rather than a full ring.

These cells are characterized by a disproportional increase in the ratio of surface membrane area to volume. This is also described as a "relative membrane excess." It is due to either increased red cell surface area (increased beyond normal), or else a decreased intracellular hemoglobin content (which may cause an abnormal decrease in cell volume without affecting the amount of membrane area). The increase in the surface area to volume ratio also gives the cell decreased osmotic fragility, as it allows it to take up more water for a given amount of osmotic stress.

In vivo (within the blood vessel), the codocyte is a bell-shaped cell. It assumes a "target" configuration only when processed to obtain a blood film. In the film these cells appear thinner than normal, primarily due to their pallor (by which thickness is judged on microscopy).

When the cells are flattened out on a smear, the top of the bell is pushed to the center creating a central target with a relatively high quantity of hemoglobin.

== Causes ==
Target cells may appear in association with the following conditions:

- Liver disease: Lecithin–cholesterol acyltransferase (LCAT) activity may be decreased in obstructive liver disease. Decreased enzymatic activity increases the cholesterol to phospholipid ratio, producing an absolute increase in surface area of the red blood cell membranes or may be increased red cell membrane fluidity.
- Alpha-thalassemia and beta-thalassemia
- Hemoglobin C Disease
- Iron deficiency anemia
- Post-splenectomy: A major function of the spleen is the clearance of opsonized, deformed, and damaged erythrocytes by splenic macrophages. If splenic macrophage function is abnormal or absent because of splenectomy, altered erythrocytes will not be removed from the circulation efficiently. Therefore, increased numbers of target cells may be observed.
- Autosplenectomy caused by sickle cell anemia or hyposplenism in coeliac disease

In patients with obstructive liver disease, lecithin cholesterol acetyltransferase activity is depressed, which increases the cholesterol-to-phospholipid ratio and produces an absolute increase in the surface area of the red cell membrane. In contrast, membrane excess is only relative in patients with iron-deficiency anemia and thalassemia because of the reduced quantity of intracellular hemoglobin. When a cell membrane collapses it becomes static and stops pulsating. Target cell formation decreases the amount of oxygen that is circulated through the blood and delivered to all areas of the body.

== Symptoms ==
Elevations in target cells are the result of a shift in the exchange equilibrium between the red blood cells and the cholesterol. Also, the surface membrane to volume ratio is increased. Target cells are more resistant to osmotic lysis, which is mostly seen in dogs. Hypochromic cells in iron deficiency anemias also can show a target appearance. Target cells are abnormally resistant to saline.

== Etymology ==
From Ancient Greek, κώδων: bell.
