= Hemoglobin C =

- Specialty: Hematology
- Frequency: 0.1%

Hemoglobin C (abbreviated as HbC) is an abnormal hemoglobin in which glutamic acid residue at the 6th position of the β-globin chain is replaced with a lysine residue due to a point mutation in the HBB gene. People with one copy of the gene for hemoglobin C do not experience symptoms, but can pass the abnormal gene on to their children. Those with two copies of the gene are said to have hemoglobin C disease and can experience mild anemia. It is possible for a person to have both the gene for hemoglobin S (the form associated with sickle cell anemia) and the gene for hemoglobin C; this state is called hemoglobin SC disease, and is generally more severe than hemoglobin C disease, but milder than sickle cell anemia.

HbC was discovered by Harvey Itano and James V. Neel in 1950 in two African-American families. It has since been established that it is most common among people in West Africa. It confers survival benefits as individuals with HbC are naturally resistant to malaria caused by Plasmodium falciparum, albeit incompletely resistant.

== Symptoms and signs ==
People with one copy of the gene for hemoglobin C (termed heterozygous) do not experience significant symptoms, but can pass the abnormal gene onto their children; this condition is called hemoglobin C trait. When two hemoglobin C genes are present (termed homozygous), the individual is said to have hemoglobin C disease, and may develop mild anemia, as red blood cells containing hemoglobin C have a decreased lifespan. The anemia in hemoglobin C disease is classified as hemolytic, because it is caused by the destruction of red blood cells. An enlarged spleen, and sometimes jaundice, may also occur. Some persons with this disease may develop gallstones that require treatment. Continued hemolysis may produce pigmented gallstones, an unusual type of gallstone composed of the dark-colored contents of red blood cells.

=== Red blood cell abnormalities ===
The red blood cells of people with hemoglobin C disease are usually abnormally small (microcytic) with a high mean corpuscular hemoglobin concentration (MCHC). The high MCHC is caused by a decreased concentration of water inside the cells. Target cells, microspherocytes, and HbC crystals can be seen on microscopic examination of blood smears from homozygous patients.

=== Combinations with other conditions ===
Blood film of hemoglobin SC disease, showing many target cells and few sickle cells

HbC can combine with other abnormal hemoglobins and cause serious hemoglobinopathies. Individuals with sickle cell–hemoglobin C (HbSC), have inherited the gene for sickle cell disease (HbS) from one parent and the gene for hemoglobin C disease (HbC) from the other parent. Since HbC does not polymerize as readily as HbS, there is less sickling in most cases. There are fewer acute vaso-occlusive events and therefore in some cases fewer sickle cell crises. The peripheral smear demonstrates mostly target cells, occasional hemoglobin C crystals, and only a few sickle cells. However, persons with hemoglobin SC disease (HbSC) have more significant retinopathy, ischemic necrosis of bone, and priapism than those with pure SS disease.

There are also a few cases of HbC in combination with HbO, HbD and beta thalassemia.

== Genetics ==
Hemoglobin C is produced when a point mutation in the HBB gene causes amino acid substitution of glutamic acid to lysine at the 6th position of the β-globin chain of the hemoglobin. The mutation can be homozygous, occurring on both the chromosomes (alleles), or heterozygous, affecting only one allele. Under heterozygous condition, people are said to have hemoglobin C trait, or as hemoglobin C carriers, and they have one gene for HbC with either one HbA gene or HbS gene. Their red blood cells contain both hemoglobin C and either normal hemoglobin A or hemoglobin S. Hemoglobin C mutation is an autosomal recessive disorder that results from the biparental inheritance of the allele that encodes for hemoglobin C. If both parents are carriers of hemoglobin C, there is a chance of having a child with hemoglobin C disease. Assuming both parents are carriers, there is a 25% chance of having a child with hemoglobin C disease, a 50% chance of having a child who is a carrier of hemoglobin C, and a 25% chance of having a child who is neither a carrier nor affected by hemoglobin C disease.

This mutated form reduces the normal plasticity of host erythrocytes causing a hemoglobinopathy. In those who are heterozygous for the mutation, about 28–44% of total hemoglobin (Hb) is HbC, and no anemia develops. In homozygotes, nearly all Hb is in the HbC form, resulting in mild hemolytic anemia, jaundice and enlargement of spleen.

== Resistance to malaria ==
Individuals with HbC have reduced risk of P. falciparum malaria infection. HbC has been described as being more advantageous than HbS because, even in homozygous individuals, it is usually non-fatal. However, in contrast to HbS, it does not prevent malaria due to P. vivax, and is less effective in resistance to falciparum malaria in heterozygous conditions. Homozygous HbC is more resistant to heterozygous condition, or to thalassemias. But HbC mutation does not prevent the infection. P. falciparum do not survive in red blood cells with homozygous hemoglobins, but can survive in the presence of heterozygous hemoglobins. HbC reduced the binding force (cytoadherence) of P. falciparum by reducing the activity of PfEMP1. Evidences indicate that HbC reduced the level of PfEMP1, which is required for effective binding and invasion of RBC by the malarial parasite. It has been predicted that with the trend of HbC mutation and falciparum prevalence, HbC would replace HbS in central West Africa in the future.

== Diagnosis ==
Physical examination may show an enlarged spleen. Tests that may be done include: complete blood count (CBC), hemoglobin electrophoresis, and peripheral blood smear.

== Prevention ==
Genetic counseling may be appropriate for high-risk couples who wish to have a baby.

== Treatment ==
Usually no treatment is needed. Folic acid supplementation may help produce normal red blood cells and improve the symptoms of anemia

== Prognosis ==
Overall, hemoglobin C disease is one of the more benign hemoglobinopathies. Mild-to-moderate reduction in RBC lifespan may accompany from mild hemolytic anemia. Individuals with hemoglobin C disease have sporadic episodes of musculoskeletal (joint) pain. People with hemoglobin C disease can expect to lead a normal life.

== Epidemiology ==
Hemoglobin C is found most abundantly in areas of West Africa, such as Nigeria, where Yorubas live. Hemoglobin C gene is found in 2-3% of African-Americans while 8% of African-Americans have hemoglobin S (Sickle) gene. Thus Hemoglobin SC disease is significantly more common than Hemoglobin CC disease. The trait also affects people whose ancestors came from Italy, Greece, Latin America, and the Caribbean region. However, it is possible for a person of any race or nationality to have hemoglobin C trait. In terms of geographic distribution, the hemoglobin C allele is found at the highest frequencies in West Africa, where it has been associated with protection against malaria. Hemoglobin C disease is present at birth, though some cases may not be diagnosed until adulthood. Both males and females are affected equally.

== History ==
Studying the molecular basis of sickle cell disease, Linus Pauling and Harvey Itano at the California Institute of Technology discovered in 1949 that the disease was due to abnormal hemoglobin called HBS. In 1950, Itano and James V. Neel discovered from two African-American families a different blood condition very similar to sickle cell disease. Five of the ten individuals indicated sickled RBCs. But the condition was harmless as the individuals had no anaemia. Thus, it was not clear whether it was involved in sickle cell disease. Genetically, the abnormal hemoglobin was only in heterozygous condition. The next year, Neel and his colleagues established that the hemoglobin is associated with sickle cell disease.

The hemoglobin was named hemoglobin III, but hemoglobin C was eventually used. By 1954, it was found that the mutant hemoglobin was highly prevalent in West Africa. In 1960, Vernon Ingram and J. A. Hunt at the University of Cambridge discovered that the mutation was a single amino acid replacement of glutamic acid with lysine.
