= Hermann Lehmann =

British biochemist and physician (1910–1985)

Hermann Lehmann CBE FRS
- Born: 8 July 1910; Halle, German Empire
- Died: 13 July 1985 (aged 75); Cambridge, Cambridgeshire, England
- Citizenship: Naturalised British
- Education: Heidelberg University; Cambridge University
- Occupations: Biochemist, physician
- Known for: Hemoglobin variants Molecular anthropology
- Spouse: Benigna Norman-Butler (m. 1940)
- Children: 2 sons and 2 daughters
- Awards: Rivers Memorial Medal (1961)

Hermann Lehmann CBE FRS (8 July 1910 – 13 July 1985) was a German-born British physician and biochemist known for his works on the chemistry and diversity of hemoglobin. Describing about 75 different hemoglobin, he discovered the most number of hemoglobin types than anyone else. He is regarded as one of the founders of molecular anthropology.

== Biography ==
Hermann Lehmann was born in Halle, eastern Germany. His father Paul Lehmann was publisher of two local newspaper. His mother Bella (née Apelt) died when he was three years old. He had three sisters and one half-brother. He attended the state school at Halle for his elementary education. An economic depression, hyperinflation in the Weimar Republic, forced his father to abandon publication at Halle, and his family moved to Dresden in 1923.

He completed secondary education at the Gymnasium zum heiligen Kreuz (now the Kreuzschule) in 1928. Soon after enrolling in a medical course at the University of Freiberg in Breisgau, his father died and moved to Frankfurt to live with his uncle and study there. In 1931, he entered Heidelberg University but before he complete the M.D. course, the rising anti-Semitism of Nazism compelled him to give up his final examination in 1933. Moving to Switzerland, he submitted his already finished thesis on gastric secretion titled Salzsauräproduktion in Sauglingsmagen nach Histaminreiz. Beobachtet mittels fraktionerter Ausheberung to the University of Basel. The university awarded him an M.D. in January 1934, but without medical license since his medical course was in Germany.

He was appointed as a research assistant to Otto Fritz Meyerhof (winner of the Nobel Prize in Physiology and Medicine in 1922) at the Kaiser Wilhelm Institute in Heidelberg. Meyerhof arranged for his visit to the University of Cambridge in 1935, where he met Frederick Gowland Hopkins, winner of the Nobel Prize in Physiology or Medicine in 1929. Hopkins invited him to move to Cambridge, and it was anecdotally said: "Gowland Hopkins told him to leave his white coat hanging behind the door of the laboratory where it would be ready for him on his return!" The same year he attended a conference at Moscow, upon the return of which he was accused of attending the Trades Union Conference. As life got more difficult, he went back to England and get enrolled for a Ph.D. course in biochemistry at Christ's College, Cambridge in 1936. Joseph Needham and Dorothy Needham, a researcher couple at Hopkins' laboratory helped him get a grant for Jewish refugees and let him their house. Supervised by Joseph Needham, his thesis was on Aspects of carbohydrate metabolism in the absence of molecular oxygen. He received the degree two years later and immediately worked under the Beit Memorial Fellowships for Medical Research until 1942.

As World War II advanced, classified as a "friendly alien", he was among the Jewish refugees rounded up at Huyton in 1940. In October, he was released and volunteered himself in the work efforts. Charles Scott Sherrington, Nobel laureate and former President of the Royal Society, help him get a position in the Emergency Medical Service at Runwell Hospital in Essex. In 1942, he was recruited, again with help of Sherrington, in the Royal Army Medical Corps (R.A.M.C.) to investigate a rampant anaemia in the British Army in India. He was initially a pathologist, raised to Lieutenant Colonel and later appointed assistant director of pathology to the North East India Command. It was while working there that he received an application for naturalisation from a "certain Captain Lehmann, R.A.M.C.", to which he sent a full recommendation. His major works in the biochemistry of blood originated there as he witnessed high incidence of iron deficiency among the Indian troops. As the war ended he was demobilised in the late 1946, and was appointed in 1947 as a Senior Nutrition Research Officer under Colonial Medical Research Fellowship at Makerere College (now Makerere University) in Kampala, Uganda.

In 1949, he returned to England as Consultant Pathologist at the Pembury Hospital in Kent. He moved to St Bartholomew's Hospital in London as a Senior Lecturer in 1951 and worked there until 1963. He was appointed as a biochemist at the Addenbrooke’s Hospital of the University of Cambridge in 1963. The Medical Research Council established the Abnormal Haemoglobin Research Unit under his supervision that year under the university. He eventually became the first professor of clinical biochemistry in the university in 1967. Between 1963 and 1975 he was Honorary Director of the World Health Organization for the Abnormal Haemoglobin Research Unit. He retired from the university in 1977, and continued a research programme called the National Haemoglobin Reference Centre funded by WHO.

In 1940, Lehmann married Benigna Norman-Butler, a musician, with whom he had two daughters, Susan and Ruth, and two sons, Paul and David.

== Scientific contributions ==
Lehmann was a pioneer in the study of the chemistry of blood. One of his first major contributions was on the etiology of anaemia in Uganda. At the Makerere College, he found that anaemia in many Africans was due to parasitic worm infection, specifically hookworm infection. His next major work was the case of pseudocholinesterase deficiency, a deadly blood disease in which individuals have severe sensitivity to certain anesthetic drugs. While working at St Bartholomew's Hospital, he discovered that pseudocholinesterase deficiency is the cause of idiosyncratic hypersensitivity to suxamethonium. He developed biochemical test for the diagnosis, and also discovered the genetic basis of the disease.

Lehmanns most important works were on the variants of haemoglobins. He discovered about 75 different types of haemoglobins during his career. His discoveries of haemoglobins related to blood diseases such as sickle cell disease are lasting important in medicine and biochemistry. He was credited as "more than anybody responsible for cataloguing the enormous wealth of variations in the hemoglobin mutants and setting our base of understanding of the population genetics, anthropology, and clinical diversity of the structural variants."

== Honours and awards ==
Lehmann received the Darwin's Prize for his Ph.D. thesis at Christ's College in 1938. He won the Rivers Memorial Medal of the Royal Anthropological Institute in 1961 for his studies of sickle cell disease in the Andaman Islands. He is regarded as one of the founders of molecular anthropology. He was elected a Fellow of the Christ's College in 1965, and became an honorary fellow in 1982. At Christ's College, he served as Fellows’ Steward, editor of the college magazine, and president of the College Medical Society. The University of Cambridge conferred him the degree of D.Sc. in 1957. He was an honorary professor in the University of Freiburg in 1964.

He received the Martin Luther King Prize for Research on Sickle-Cell Anaemia in 1971, Conway Evans Prize of the Royal Society and Royal College of Physicians in 1976, and Wellcome Prize of the British Association for the Advancement of Science in 1978. He was elected FRS in 1972. He was elected President of the British Association for the Advancement of Science in 1972, and President of the Cambridge Philosophical Society in 1985. He was appointed Commander of the British Empire in the 1980 Birthday Honours, and the National Order of the Ivory Coast in 1981.
