= Sickle Cell Anemia, a Molecular Disease =

1949 scientific paper by Linus Pauling et al.

"Sickle Cell Anemia, a Molecular Disease" is a 1949 scientific paper by Linus Pauling, Harvey A. Itano, Seymour J. Singer and Ibert C. Wells that established sickle-cell anemia as a genetic disease in which affected individuals have a different form of the metalloprotein hemoglobin in their blood. The paper, published in the November 25, 1949 issue of Science, reports a difference in electrophoretic mobility between hemoglobin from healthy individuals and those with sickle-cell anemia, with those with sickle cell trait having a mixture of the two types. The paper suggests that the difference in electrophoretic mobility is probably due to a different number of ionizable amino acid residues in the protein portion of hemoglobin (which was confirmed in 1956 by Vernon Ingram), and that this change in molecular structure is responsible for the sickling process. It also reports the genetic basis for the disease, consistent with the simultaneous genealogical study by James V. Neel: those with sickle-cell anemia are homozygous for the disease gene, while heterozygous individuals exhibit the usually asymptomatic condition of sickle cell trait.

The paper introduced the concept of a "molecular disease", and is considered a major impetus to the development of molecular medicine. The paper helped establish that genes control not just the presence or absence of enzymes (as genetics had shown in the early 1940s) but also the specific structure of protein molecules. It was also an important triumph in the efforts of Pauling and others to apply the instruments and methods of the physical sciences to biology, and Pauling used it promote such research and attract funding.

== Caltech work ==
Linus Pauling was a prominent physical chemist at the California Institute of Technology (a main focal point of Warren Weaver's efforts to promote what he called "molecular biology" through Rockefeller Foundation grants). In the mid-1930s, Pauling turned his attention to the physical and chemical nature of hemoglobin. In 1946, he set graduate student Harvey Itano (who had been previously trained as a physician) the task of finding differences in hemoglobin that might explain sickle cell disease. After failing to find any differences in size, weight, or acid-base titration (despite the advanced instruments available at Caltech), Itano found that oxygen could inhibit the sickling process while various reducing agents could speed it up; this was the basis of Pauling and Itano's first publication on the disease. Itano also found that the globin portion of sickle cell hemoglobin had a barely detectable difference in electrical charge.

To measure this electrical difference precisely, Pauling assigned graduate student John Singer to work with Itano and another medical researcher, Ibert C. Wells, before Pauling left in early 1948 for a guest lectureship in England. Using a "Tiselius Apparatus" to perform free-boundary electrophoresis, Pauling's three researchers were able to estimate that molecules of sickle-cell hemoglobin had about three more positive charges than normal hemoglobin. They also estimated that blood from those with sickle cell trait was a mixture of 60 percent normal hemoglobin and 40 percent sickle-cell hemoglobin. Near the end of the project, they learned of parallel results by geneticist James V. Neel, who demonstrated the inheritance pattern of the disease by traditional genetic methods; both Neel's work and that of Pauling's group were published in the same issue of Science.

== Follow-up work ==
Following the 1949 paper, Itano left the Pauling laboratory to work with Neel; in the following years Itano and Neel used electrophoresis to identify a number of other human hemoglobin variants, including some associated with other diseases. At Caltech, a comparison of the amino acid content of normal and sickle cell hemoglobins showed that there were several differences in chemical makeup, but did not explain the difference in electric charge that made electrophoretic separation possible. The cause of this difference was pinpointed in 1956 and 1957, when Vernon Ingram used protein fingerprinting (a combination of electrophoresis and chromatography) to show that the key difference between normal hemoglobins and sickle cell hemoglobins was a single difference in one chain of the protein: a glutamic acid residue on the normal hemoglobin in place of a valine residue on the sickle cell hemoglobin.

The molecular disease concept put forward in the 1949 paper also became the basis for Linus Pauling's view of evolution. In the 1960s, by which time it had been shown that sickle cell trait confers resistance to malaria and so the gene had both positive and negative effects and demonstrated heterozygote advantage, Pauling suggested that molecular diseases were actually the basis of evolutionary change. He also advocated eugenic policies, such as marking all who carry the sickle cell trait and other molecular disease genes, to reduce the number of children born with genetic diseases.
