= Coboglobin =

A coboglobin is a synthetic compound, a metalloprotein chemically similar to hemoglobin or myoglobin but using the metal cobalt instead of iron (hence the name). Just like hemoglobin and myoglobin, the coboglobins are able to reversibly bind molecular oxygen (O_{2}) at the metal atom. However, they lose this ability much faster than the natural molecules.

Blood of this type would be uncoloured and clear when in the veins while amber yellow in colour in the arteries.
