= Hemoglobin-G =

== Origins ==
Hemoglobin G, Hemoglobin G-Philadelphia, or HbG, is a mutation of the cells that oxygenate blood. The G-Philadelphia variant is most commonly found in African Americans, with carriers being every 1 in 5,000. The trait is normal-functioning and has no known negative effects.

The mutation was first discovered in 1971, during the boom of research in to hemoglobin. The push was backed by the desire to research the causes and possibly fight sickle cell anemia and other types of anemia. Because the strict laws of clinical testing had not existed in the 1970s, clinical trials were conducted almost immediately upon the granting of the National Sickle Cell Act of 1971.

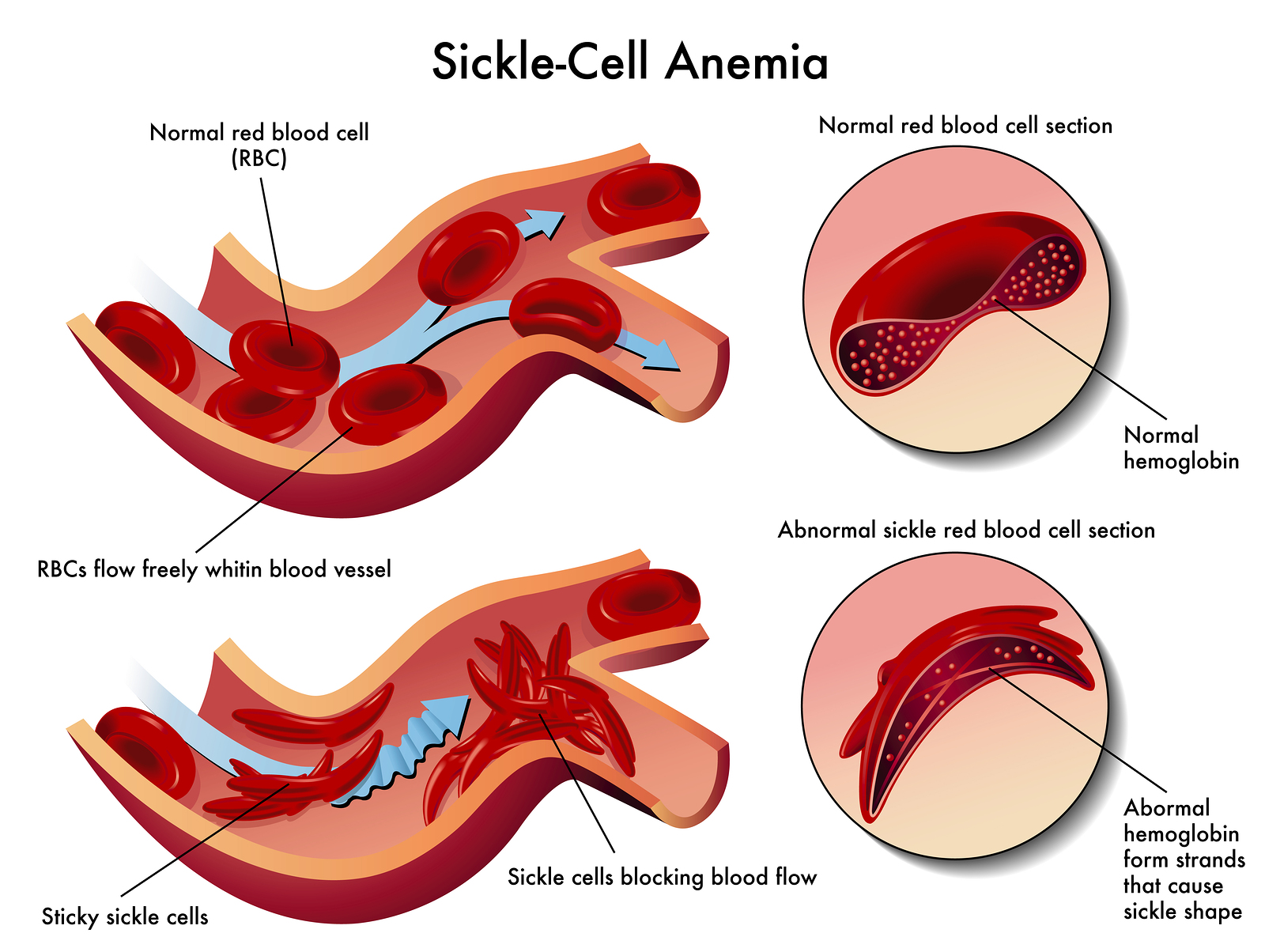

== Historical research ==
Schwartz et al confirmed that Hemoglobin G is a normal mutation of the combination of S and A alleles, which is reflected in the chart below.

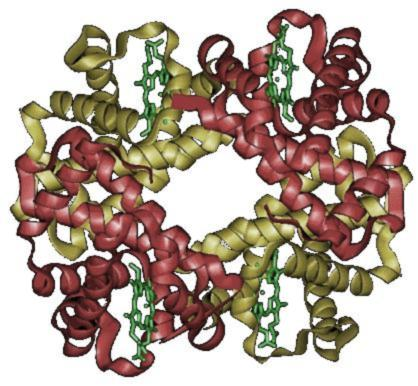
Hemoglobin

== Recent findings ==
Over time the variant has been shown more commonly in people of African and of Asian descent. The clinical presentations of the gene mutation are regarded as either microcytic or hypochromic if they are detectable at all. While the trait is not known to be abnormal on its own, the mutation of the gene can have an effect on the absorption of alcohol. As well as physical difficulties with alcohol and other blood-altering substances, the hemoglobin has also been shown to effect the way the brain handles sleep disorders, like insomnia. People with the G mutation are typically more likely to have issues oxygenating blood and because of this, anemia was thought to be a side-effect of the mutation.
The overall consensus among clinicians is that the "G-Philadelphia" mutation is harmless and has no clinical consequences.

== Clinical perspective ==
Presumptive Diagnosis	Alpha Gene Arrangement	Functioning α-genes	Inheritance	Hgb G, %	Clinical Presentation
uncomplicated G trait, no thalassemia	αG α/α α	4	Mediterranean	20-25	No defect
alpha thal 2 with trans G trait	α -/αG – or – α/αG –	2	Mediterranean	35-45	Microcytic
alpha thal 2 trait, G trait	α3.7G/α α	3	African American	25-35	Usually no defect
alpha thal 2, G trait	α3.7G/- α	2	African plus other	40-45	Microcytic/Hypochromic
alpha thal 2, homozygous G	α3.7G/α3.7G	2	African American	95	Microcytic/Hypochromic
α thal 2/α thal 1, G trait (also known as H Disease, G trait)	α3.7G/ – –	1	rare	no A	Microcytic (MCV 55 fL) precipitation of beta-tetramers splenomegaly ineffective hematopoiesis bone marrow erythroid expansion

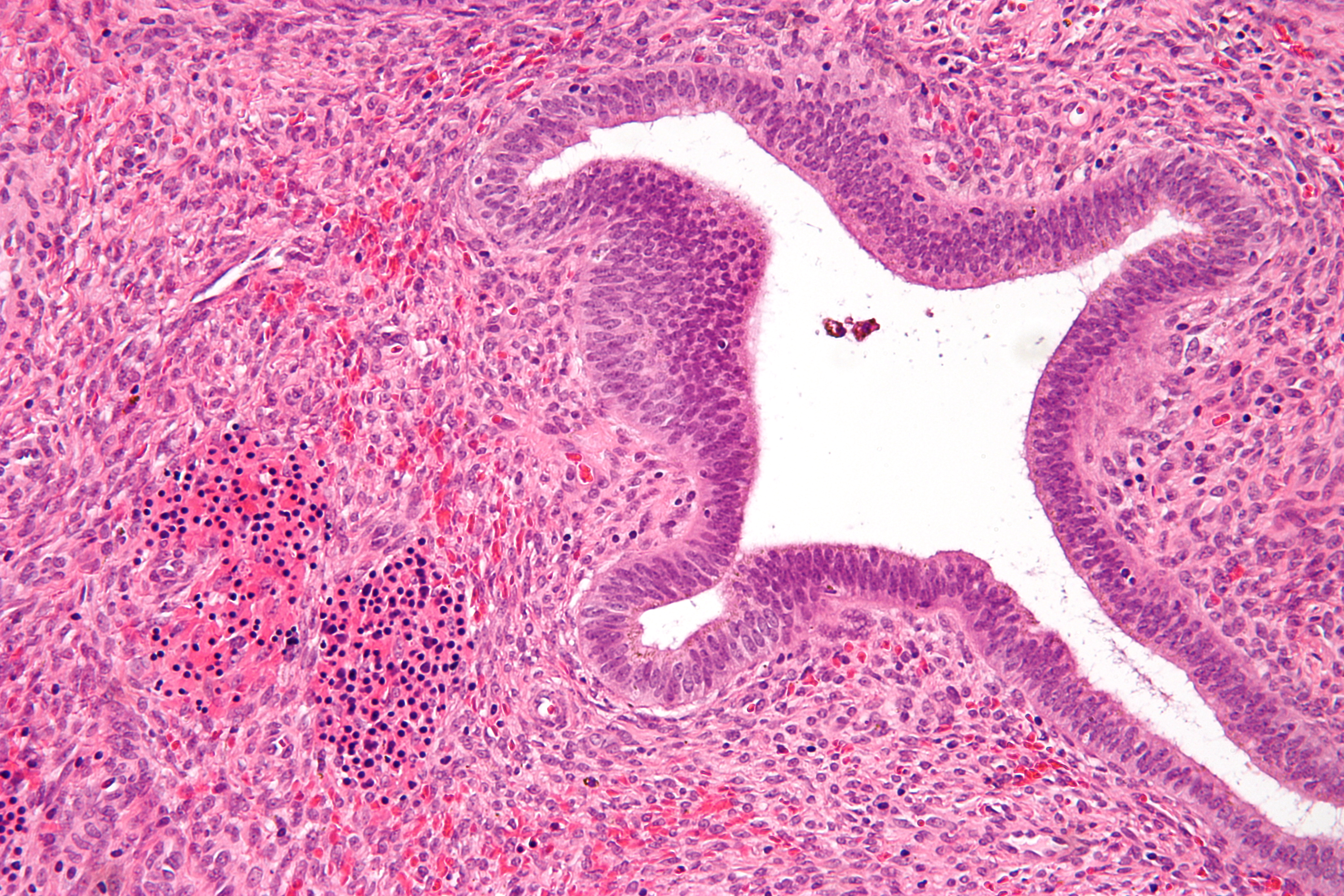
Nucleated Red Blood Cells
