= Molecular medicine =

Medical specialty and academic discipline

Molecular medicine is a broad field, where physical, chemical, biological, bioinformatics and medical techniques are used to describe molecular structures and mechanisms, identify fundamental molecular and genetic errors of disease, and to develop molecular interventions to correct them. The molecular medicine perspective emphasizes cellular and molecular phenomena and interventions rather than the previous conceptual and observational focus on patients and their organs.

== History ==
In November 1949, with the seminal paper, "Sickle Cell Anemia, a Molecular Disease", in Science magazine, Linus Pauling, Harvey Itano and their collaborators laid the groundwork for establishing the field of molecular medicine. In 1956, Roger J. Williams wrote Biochemical Individuality, a prescient book about genetics, prevention and treatment of disease on a molecular basis, and nutrition which is now variously referred to as individualized medicine and orthomolecular medicine. Another paper in Science by Pauling in 1968, introduced and defined this view of molecular medicine that focuses on natural and nutritional substances used for treatment and prevention.

Published research and progress was slow until the 1970s' "biological revolution" that introduced many new techniques and commercial applications.

== Molecular surgery ==
Some researchers separate molecular surgery as a compartment of molecular medicine.

== Education ==
Molecular medicine is a new scientific discipline in European universities. Combining contemporary medical studies with the field of biochemistry, it offers a bridge between the two subjects. At present, only a handful of universities offer the course to undergraduates. With a degree in this discipline, the graduate is able to pursue a career in medical sciences, scientific research, laboratory work, and postgraduate medical degrees.

=== Subjects ===
Core subjects are similar to biochemistry courses and typically include gene expression, research methods, proteins, cancer research, immunology, biotechnology and many more. In some universities molecular medicine is combined with another discipline such as chemistry, functioning as an additional study to enrich the undergraduate program.

== See also ==
- Metabolomics
- Molecular biology
- Molecular diagnostics
- Molecular Medicine (journal)
- Molecular pathological epidemiology
- Molecular pathology
