= Hematology =

Study of blood and blood diseases

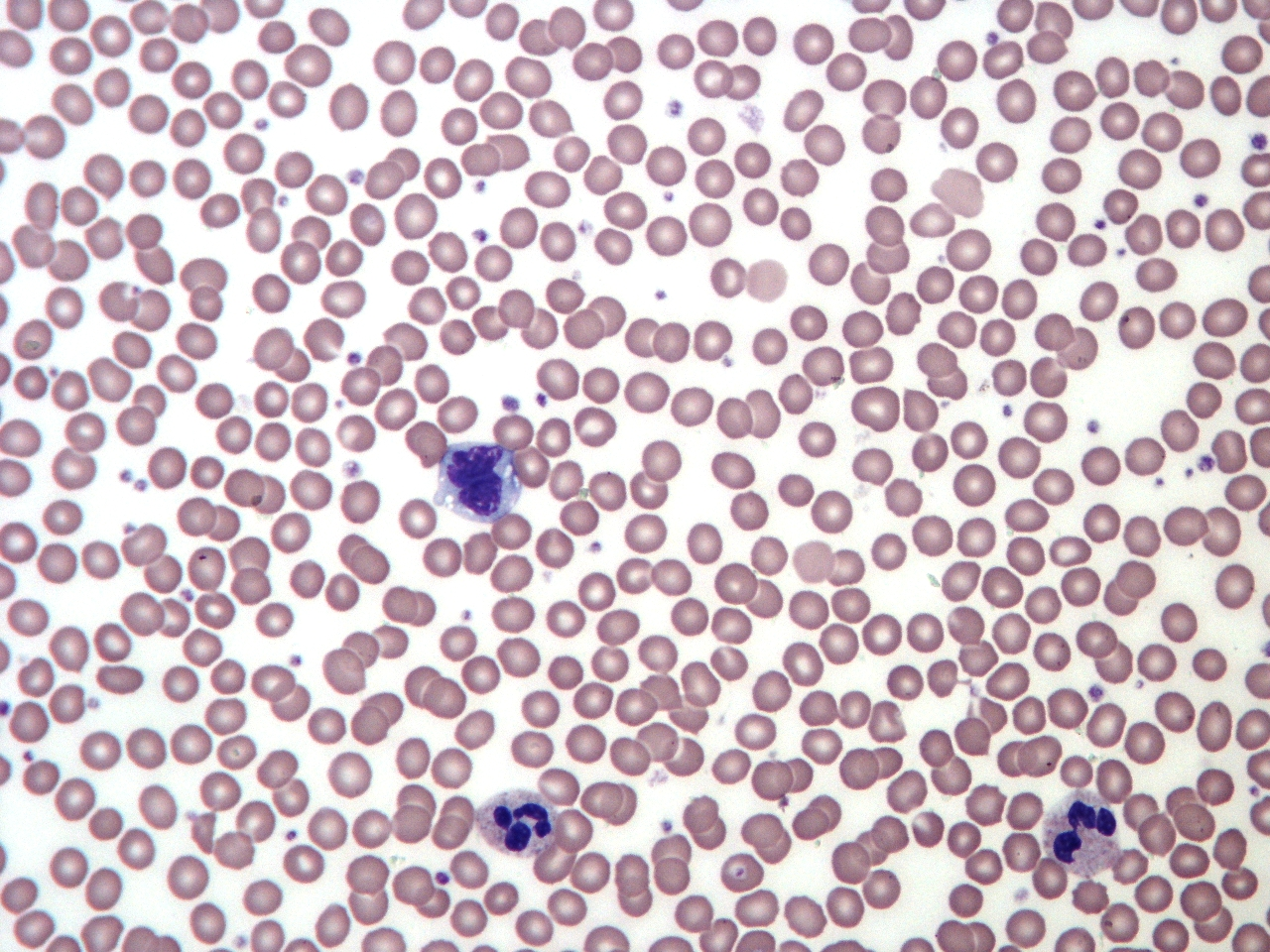
- Normal adult human blood cells viewed under a microscope. Most of the cells seen here are red blood cells (pink); a few white blood cells (purple) are also visible.
- System: Hematopoietic system
- Subdivisions: Transfusion medicine
- Significant diseases: Anemia, leukemia, lymphoma.
- Significant tests: Blood film, bone marrow biopsy
- Specialist: Hematologist

Hematologist
Occupation
- Names: Physician
- Occupation type: Specialty
- Activity sectors: Medicine

Description
- Education required: Doctor of Medicine (M.D.); Doctor of Osteopathic medicine (D.O.); Bachelor of Medicine, Bachelor of Surgery (M.B.B.S.)
- Fields of employment: Hospitals, Clinics

Hematology (spelled haematology in British English) is the branch of medicine concerned with the study of the cause, prognosis, treatment, and prevention of diseases related to blood. It involves treating conditions that affect the components of blood, such as blood cells and clotting factors, as well as the sources of production of these components, such as bone marrow and the spleen. Examples of classical (noncancerous) hematologic disorders include anemias and blood clotting and bleeding disorders. Examples of blood cancers include leukemia, lymphoma, and multiple myeloma. Hematologists are the specific medical doctors who are rigorously educated, via medical school and further subspecialty training, in treating these and many other blood disorders.

== Scope ==
Physicians (medical doctors) specialized in hematology are known as hematologists. Their work involves caring for patients with hematologic diseases, both in the hospital and the clinic. Hematologists are formally trained in diagnosing and treating both classical (noncancerous) and cancerous hematologic disorders; some hematologists specialize in one or the other, while some continue to see both types of patients throughout their careers. Examples of conditions treated by hematologists include:

- anemias, such as iron deficiency anemia, sickle cell anemia, and aplastic anemia
- hemoglobinopathies (disorders of abnormal hemoglobin, the protein in the blood that carries oxygen), such as thalassemias and pathologic hemoglobin variants
- bleeding disorders, such as hemophilias and von Willebrand Disease
- clotting disorders, such as Factor V Leiden, antiphospholipid syndrome, and heparin-induced thrombocytopenia
- blood cancers, such as leukemia, lymphoma, and multiple myeloma
- disorders requiring blood transfusions (see transfusion medicine)
- care following bone marrow transplantation.

Physicians who are not specialized in hematology can and do provide care for patients with hematologic disorders. For example, if a patient is found to have anemia while in the hospital for another problem, the physician caring for them can begin a diagnostic evaluation to figure out why the patient is anemic and may choose to initiate treatment for the anemia. However, if initial testing does not provide a definitive answer or if the anemia is found to be particularly complex, that physician may choose to consult a hematologist to advise on more specialized or advanced next steps.

In contrast to hematologists, who work directly with patients, hematopathologists are laboratory-based physicians who view blood films and bone marrow slides under the microscope, interpret various hematological test results and blood clotting test results, and write up their conclusions in reports which can then be used by hematologists and other physicians to dictate diagnoses and treatments.

== Training Pathway ==
To become a hematologist in the U.S., the most common training pathway is as follows:

- complete a four-year medical degree (MD or DO)
- complete a three-year residency in internal medicine or pediatrics
- pass internal medicine or pediatrics board exams
- complete a three- to five-year fellowship in hematology-oncology (depending on amount of time spent dedicated to research)
- pass hematology and oncology subspecialty board exams.

== History ==
The term "hematology" first appeared in the medical literature in German physician Thomas Schwenke's Haematologia, sive sanguinis historia in 1743. At this time, the study of blood and its disorders had not yet matured into a distinct medical specialty, still being considered part of the broader field of internal medicine. Though blood had been examined under the microscope as early as the 17th century by microscopists such as van Leeuwenhoek, it was not until the advent of more advanced staining techniques and cell theory that the components of blood were characterized in greater detail. Erythrocytes, leukocytes, and platelets were studied, and the observation that platelets are derived from megakaryocytes was one of the keys that led to the critical conclusion that the core components of blood are derived in the bone marrow.

In the early 1900s, characterization of the ABO blood group system allowed pre-transfusion screening, which reduced adverse reactions resulting from patients receiving donations of mismatched blood. The first blood banks were established, and stored donor blood was readily available rather than having to find an emergency donor in the moment. The first ever chemotherapy, derived from the nitrogen mustard used in WWI, was approved by the FDA in 1949 for the treatment of lymphoma. Around the same time, in the mid-1900s, Dr. Sidney Farber began successful treatment of pediatric acute lymphoblastic leukemia with aminopterin, an antifolate agent that prevented the cancerous leukemia cells from multiplying. In the mid-1900s, bone marrow transplant began to be researched as a way to replace a patient's overactive, cancer cell-producing bone marrow with healthy marrow tissue from a donor. In 1968, Dr. Robert Good performed the first HLA-matched bone marrow transplant, in which the donor and recipient were matched based on their human leukocyte antigen (HLA) types; this greatly reduced the chance of graft versus host disease, a condition in which a transplant recipient's immune system rejects the donated tissue.

Although chemotherapy has revolutionized treatment and prognosis for patients with cancer, its unintended side effects can seriously impact patients' quality of life and can limit the number of cycles of chemotherapy that they can tolerate. These side effects occur because chemotherapy, though aimed at preventing cancer cells from multiplying and spreading, also affects healthy cells. This can lead to symptoms such as fatigue, nausea, vomiting, hair loss, low blood cell counts, digestive issues, and cognitive difficulties, among others. Thus, some research has focused instead on targeted therapies, which are directed at specific proteins and/or pathways only found in cancer cells, with the goal of sparing healthy cells.

== Nomenclature ==
In the 21st century, there has been conversation on the naming convention for the subfield of hematology relating to noncancerous disorders. It has long been referred to as benign or nonmalignant hematology, but recent discourse has suggested that this can minimize the serious impact those conditions have on patients' lives. Some examples of serious, noncancerous hematologic disorders include: hemophilia, in which patients bleed excessively due to difficulty forming blood clots; aplastic anemia, in which patients' bone marrow does not produce enough cells, leading to severe fatigue, susceptibility to life-threatening infections, and increased bruising and bleeding; catastrophic antiphospholipid syndrome (CAPS), in which blood clots form around the body and lead to multi-organ failure; and many others. Consequently, some physicians advocate for the use of the term "classical hematology" to refer to the field of noncancerous hematology. This preserves the separation from the field of malignant hematology while avoiding terms that may understate the severity of noncancerous hematologic conditions.
