= Hemoglobin J =

Hemoglobin J is an abnormal hemoglobin, an alpha globin gene variant and present in various geographic locations. It was first reported in a black American family in 1956, and later reported from Indonesia, India, and other parts of the world. Hemoglobin J reported from Meerut India shows the mutation of 120th alanine to glutamic acid on alpha chain. Hemoglobin J was also reported from Chhattisgarh, Central India as revealed by Lingojwar and coworkers in 2016.
