= Hemoglobin O-Arab =

Hemoglobin O-Arab (American English) or Haemoglobin O-Arab (British English) is a rare alternation of Hemoglobin (American English) or Haemoglobin (British English), characterised with the presence of β^121Glu → Lys (Hb O-Arab). Mutations of heterozygotes for Hb O-Arab have been reported in Saudi Arabia, North Africa, Sudan, the Mediterranean and the United States. Diagnosis of Hb O-Arab requires liquid chromatography on both cellulose acetate and citrate agar, due to co-migrating with Hb C at alkaline pH. When combined with Hemoglobin S (β^6Glu → Val) it causes a severe form of Sickle cell disease known as Hemoglobin S/O-Arab. Detection of Hb O-Arab can be carried out with a blood test, identifying the carries of hemoglobinopathies, so as to inform patients their chances of producing an affected child and ensure appropriate guidance is given.

== Research history ==
Although the molecular structure of hemoglobin itself has been determined by molecular biologist, Max Perutz, by X-Ray Crystallography, earning his work with partner, John Kendrew the 1962 Nobel Prize in Chemistry, the molecular structure of hemoglobin O-Arab has not been obtained yet. The first sighted case of Hb O-Arab in combination with sickle hemoglobin was described in 1960 in an Arabic boy with severe hemolytic anaemia and recurrent painful episodes. Following cases of patients inheriting hetereozygotes for Hb O-Arab have been evident in the Middle Eastern descent, having clinical and laboratory manifestations characteristic of a sickling disease with hemolytic anaemia.

The most commonly used method for Hemoglobin analysis used is alkaline cellulose acetate electrophoresis at pH 8.6, due to its ability to split hemoglobin into its common variants, however a review of the College of American Pathologists (CAP) Hemoglobinopahty Survey Reports has provided the number of laboratories that utilise high-performance liquid chromatography (HPLC) technology for identification of hemoglobin variants, increasing approximately 12.5 fold in over the past decade. It is of clinical significance to be able to differentiate accurately between hemoglobin variants because of their reactions with Hemoglobin S to clinically different diseases, allowing data to be displayed through chromatograms to represent a visual insight of elution of Hb O-Arab using retention time. to By using HPLC, it can accurately and reliable differentiate between Hemoglobin C and Hemoglobin O-Arab without any requirements for further confirmatory tests as stated by current CAP standards.

== Effects ==
When Hemoglobin O-Arab co-inherits with Hemoglobin S, it produces a syndrome with similarities in severity to sickle cell anaemia, having severe haemolytic anaemia and red cells denser than normal with occurrences of some cells as dense as if contract with sickle cell anaemia. A description with the presence of two variations of β-globin chains, β^6Glu → Val (HbS) and β^121Glu → Lys (Hb O-Arab), patients heterozygous for Hemoglobin O-Arab had denser red cells, having similar traits to sickle cell disease, with few outliers of cells of normal density. From a study formulated at Harvard Medical School, the authors have concluded that "The erythrocytic pathogenesis of Hemoglobin O-Arab involves the dehydration of red cells due to the K:Cl cotransport system." The abnormality thus explains the severe pathology of the double heterozygote for Hemoglobin S and Hemoglobin O-Arab, leading to the conclusion of a correlation of these hemoglobins present to additional haemolytic risk factor.

== Cases ==
Case reports analysed by Doctor Sayar Dror, PhD, at the Paediatric Hemato-Oncology Unit, “Dana” Children Hospital in Israel, feature three patients; a 12 month-old female of consanguineous parents, a 35 month-old female born to parents known to have the Hemoglobin O-Arab trait, and a 9 month-old male who was asymptomatic and was referred because of contracting mild anaemia. The origins of all three offspring were from South Sudan, with all three suffering from microcytic anaemia, with an average of 67.2-79% of their Hemoglobin, being Hemoglobin-O Arab. The peripheral blood smears of the tested patients displayed target cells, microcytosis, polychromasia and nucleated red blood cells. The basis drawn from these case reports is that Hemoglobin O-Arab is a rare, alternation of Hemoglobin, demonstrating effects similar to those diagnosed with mild to moderate microcytic anemia.

Another case study with data collection apparent for over 1,000 adults and paediatric patients followed by the Duke University Comprehensive Sickle Cell Center was used to identify patients, reviewing age. Gender and race to record similarities in complications in each patient such as painful vaso-occlusive events, acute chest syndrome and leg ulcers. Out of the cohort tested, with Hemoglobin O-Arab present, all patients shown a median Hemoglobin concentration of 8.7gm/dL, which is higher than the average concentration in a healthy being.

== Treatment ==
Treatment and counselling offered, depending on different ages of contraction of Hb O-Arab and severity of inheritance of the alternation. Generalised, evolution of Hb O-Arab has long survival with no visual symptoms, but act as carriers of haemoglobin disorder. Thus, treatment can include screening and blood tests before coitus can detect any affected offspring, with provided genetic counselling and chances of producing affect offspring.
