= Harvey Itano =

American biochemist who lived 1920 to 2010

Harvey Akio Itano
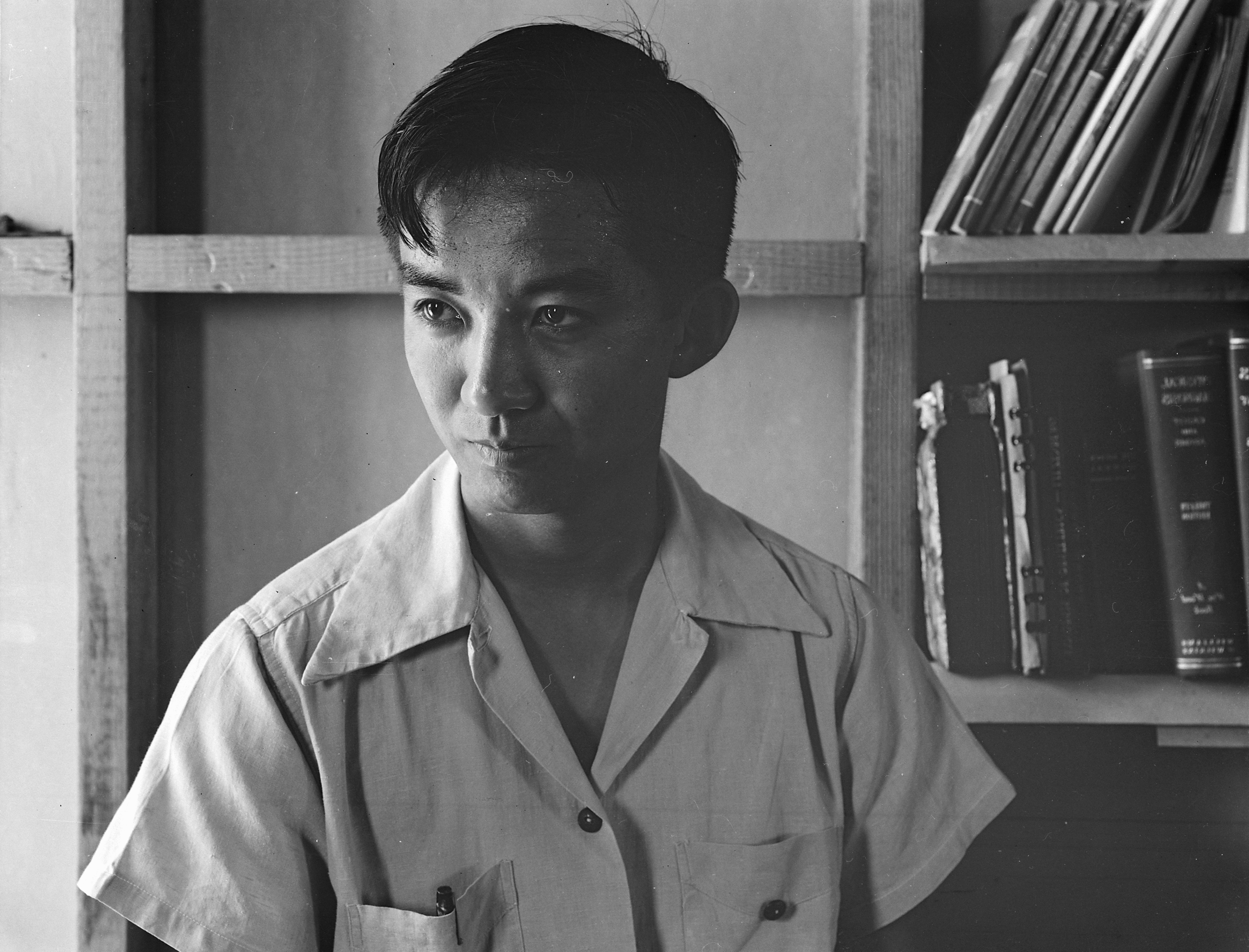
- Itano in 1942
- Born: November 3, 1920; Sacramento, California
- Died: May 8, 2010 (aged 89); La Jolla, California
- Education: University of California, Berkeley, St. Louis University, California Institute of Technology
- Known for: Differentiating normal and sickle cell hemoglobins
- Awards: Eli Lilly Award in Biological Chemistry (1954); Martin Luther King Jr. Medical Achievement Award
- Scientific career
- Fields: Biochemistry
- Institutions: National Institutes of Health; University of California, San Diego
- Thesis: I. Contributions to the Study of Sickle Cell Hemoglobin II. A Rapid Diagnostic Test for Sickle Cell Anemia (1950)
- Doctoral advisor: Linus Pauling

Harvey Akio Itano (Japanese: 板野 秋雄, November 3, 1920 – May 8, 2010) was an American biochemist best known for his work on the molecular basis of sickle cell anemia and other diseases. In collaboration with Linus Pauling, Itano used electrophoresis to demonstrate the difference between normal hemoglobin and sickle cell hemoglobin; their 1949 paper "Sickle Cell Anemia, a Molecular Disease" (coauthored also with S. J. Singer and Ibert C. Wells) was a landmark in both molecular medicine and protein electrophoresis, though the use of electrophoresis to separate hemoglobin variants had been pioneered by Maud Menten and collaborators some years earlier.

In 1979, Itano became the first Japanese American elected to the United States National Academy of Sciences (in the Genetics section). Itano was an emeritus professor of pathology at the University of California, San Diego. In 2010, Itano died of complications from Parkinson's disease in La Jolla, California.

== Early life ==
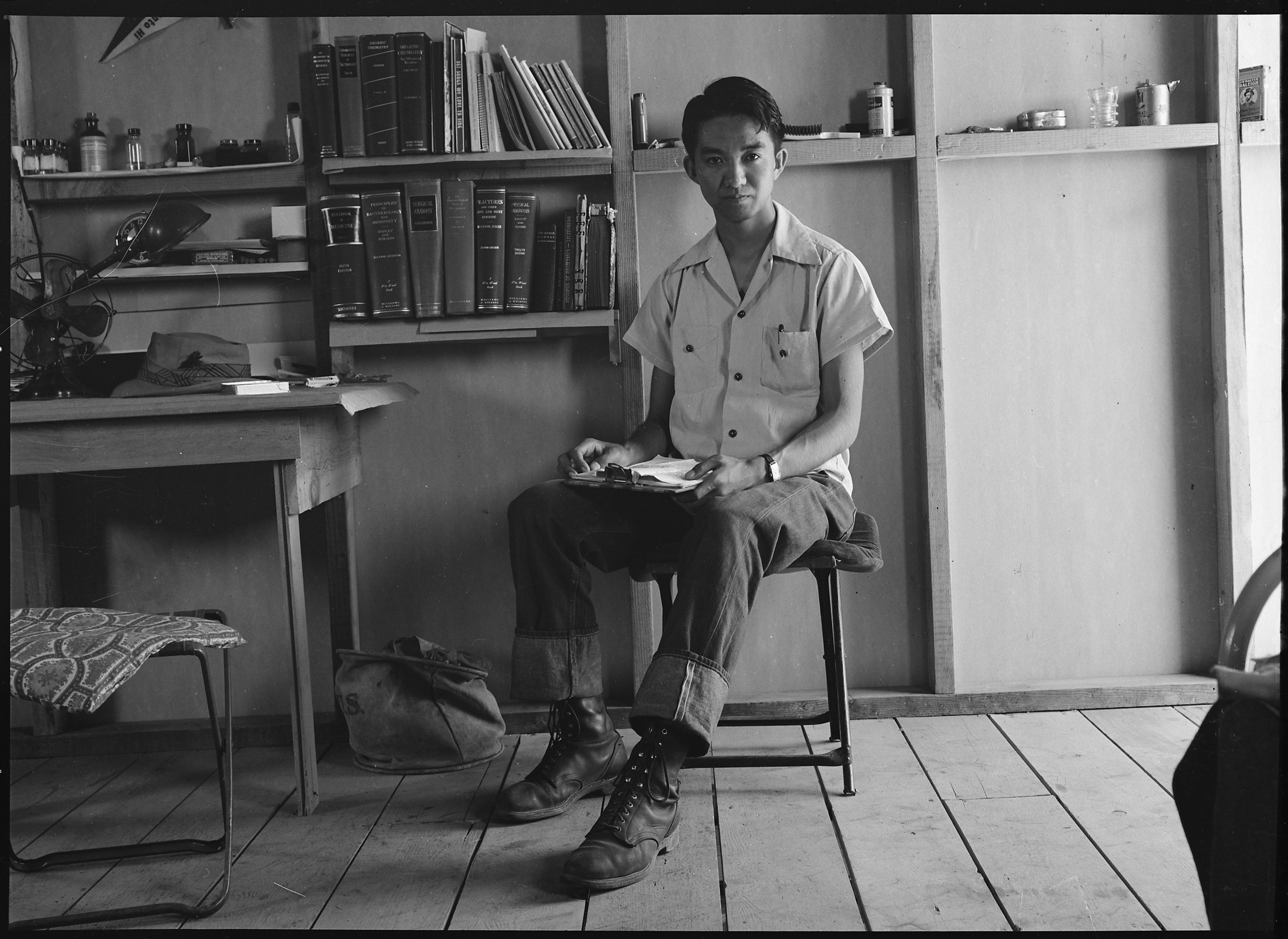
Recent UC Berkeley valedictorian Itano in an internment camp.

Itano was born in Sacramento, California. Itano attended the University of California, Berkeley where he was valedictorian of the Class of 1942. However, due to Executive Order 9066, Itano missed commencement in Berkeley after he and his family were sent to the Tanforan Assembly Center, prior to being sent to the Tule Lake internment camp. Itano was later allowed to leave camp to attend the St. Louis University medical school, earning his M.D. in 1945. He then went to graduate school at the California Institute of Technology, where he received doctorates in chemistry and physics in 1950.

== Research ==
While at Caltech, Itano joined the lab of Linus Pauling and began working on sickle cell anemia, a genetic disease that Pauling was interested in. Pauling was convinced that sickle cell disease was caused by defective hemoglobin, and set Itano to find out what made sickle cell hemoglobin chemically different. After failing with a number of other techniques, Itano succeeded in differentiating normal and sickle cell hemoglobins using moving boundary electrophoresis. He used an apparatus designed by Stanley M. Swingle, a variation on the original apparatus of electrophoresis pioneer Arne Tiselius. He found that, under certain conditions, sickle cell hemoglobin is positively charged while normal hemoglobin is not, creating a difference in electrophoretic mobility. By 1956, Vernon Ingram had determined that this was caused by a single difference in peptide sequence, which by 1958 he determined to be a valine in the sickle cell mutant hemoglobin in place of glutamic acid in normal hemoglobin A.

Itano's subsequent work brought the new field of "molecular medicine" to other genetic and blood diseases. In 1954, he won the Eli Lilly Award in Biological Chemistry, and in 1972 he won the Martin Luther King Jr. Medical Achievement Award, recognizing his sickle cell work.
