= Hemoglobin M disease =

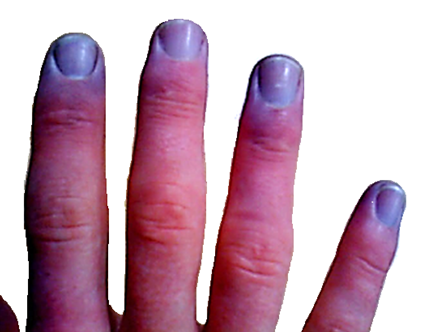
- Bluish fingertips in a cyanotic patient
- Symptoms: Cyanosis and dark brown blood
- Causes: Hemoglobin M variants
- Diagnostic method: Hemoglobin electrophoresis, UV spectroscopy, DNA sequencing, etc.
- Treatment: No treatment is required

Hemoglobin M disease is a rare form of hemoglobinopathy, characterized by the presence of hemoglobin M (HbM) and elevated methemoglobin (metHb) level in blood. HbM is an altered form of hemoglobin (Hb) due to point mutation occurring in globin-encoding genes, mostly involving tyrosine substitution for proximal (F8) or distal (E7) histidine residues. HbM variants are inherited as autosomal dominant disorders and have altered oxygen affinity. The pathophysiology of hemoglobin M disease involves heme iron autoxidation promoted by heme pocket structural alteration.

There exists at least 13 HbM variants, such as Boston, Osaka, Saskatoon, etc., named according to their geographical locations of discovery. Different HbM variants may give different signs and symptoms. Major signs include cyanosis and dark brown blood. Patients may be asymptomatic or experience dizziness, headache, mild dyspnea, etc. Diagnosis is usually suspected based on cyanosis. Biochemical testing, hemoglobin electrophoresis, ultraviolet-visible wavelength light spectroscopy, and DNA-based globin gene analysis can be used for diagnosis. Hemoglobin M disease is often not life-threatening and there is no known effective treatment.

Hemoglobin M disease is a congenital subtype of methemoglobinemia. For other congenital subtypes of methemoglobinemia, cytochrome b5 reductase (CYB5R) deficiency is the major cause, rendering defective conversion of metHb to normal Hb. CYB5R deficiency is an autosomal recessive condition.

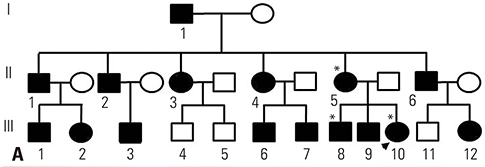
Pedigree chart of the patient's maternal family showing autosomal dominant inheritance

== Signs and symptoms ==
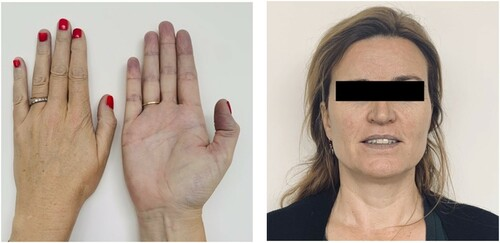
Cyanotic extremities and lip discoloration

Cyanosis is the most common sign of hemoglobin M disease, which can be observed in all kinds of hemoglobin M diseases. It is mostly presented in the patient's lips and fingertips. Cyanosis in hemoglobin M disease results from elevated levels of metHb and sulfhemoglobin (sulfHb). Dark brown blood is another major sign of hemoglobin M disease. Hemoglobin M diseases caused by different HbM variants may have slight variations in their signs and symptoms, some include signs such as hemolytic anemia, decreased HbA1c, and abnormal co-oximetry. Onset of cyanosis varies among alpha-, beta- and gamma-chain variants. Infants with alpha- or gamma-chain variants manifest cyanosis since birth but transient neonatal cyanosis caused by gamma-chain variants resolves soon after the disappearance of fetal Hb. Infants with beta-globin variants become cyanotic around 6 months after birth with the completion of the fetal-to-adult Hb switch.

Hemoglobin M disease is usually asymptomatic. However, it may show symptoms such as confusion, headache, tachycardia, and mild dyspnea at metHb level ranging from 10% to 30%. Other possible moderate signs and symptoms (metHb level above 30%) include dizziness, syncope, chest pain, palpitations, and fatigue. More severe signs (metHb level above 50%) include tachypnea, metabolic acidosis, dysrhythmia, seizure, delirium, coma, and death (metHb level above 70%).

== Pathophysiology ==
HbM is a rare methemoglobin group inherited in an autosomal dominant manner, resulting from missense mutations in genes encoding alpha (HBA1, HBA2), beta (HBB), or gamma (HBG1, HBG2) globin chains. In most HbM variants, the proximal (F8) or distal (E7) histidine residue is replaced by tyrosine. Proximal histidine (F8) is designated as position 87 in the alpha chain and 92 in the beta chain. Distal histidine (E7) is designated as position 58 in the alpha chain and position 63 in the beta chain.

=== Different HbM Variants ===
At least 13 HbM variants involving alpha- or beta- or gamma-chains have been reported. Six variants, namely HbM Boston, HbM Iwate, HbM Saskatoon, HbM Hyde Park, HbFM Osaka and HbFM Fort Ripley, manifest proximal (F8) or distal (E7) histidine substitution by tyrosine at position alpha-58, alpha-87, beta-63, beta-92, gamma-63 and gamma-92 respectively. HbM Milwaukee-1 involves valine (E11) substitution by glutamate residue at position beta-67.

=== Alterations in Oxygen Affinity ===
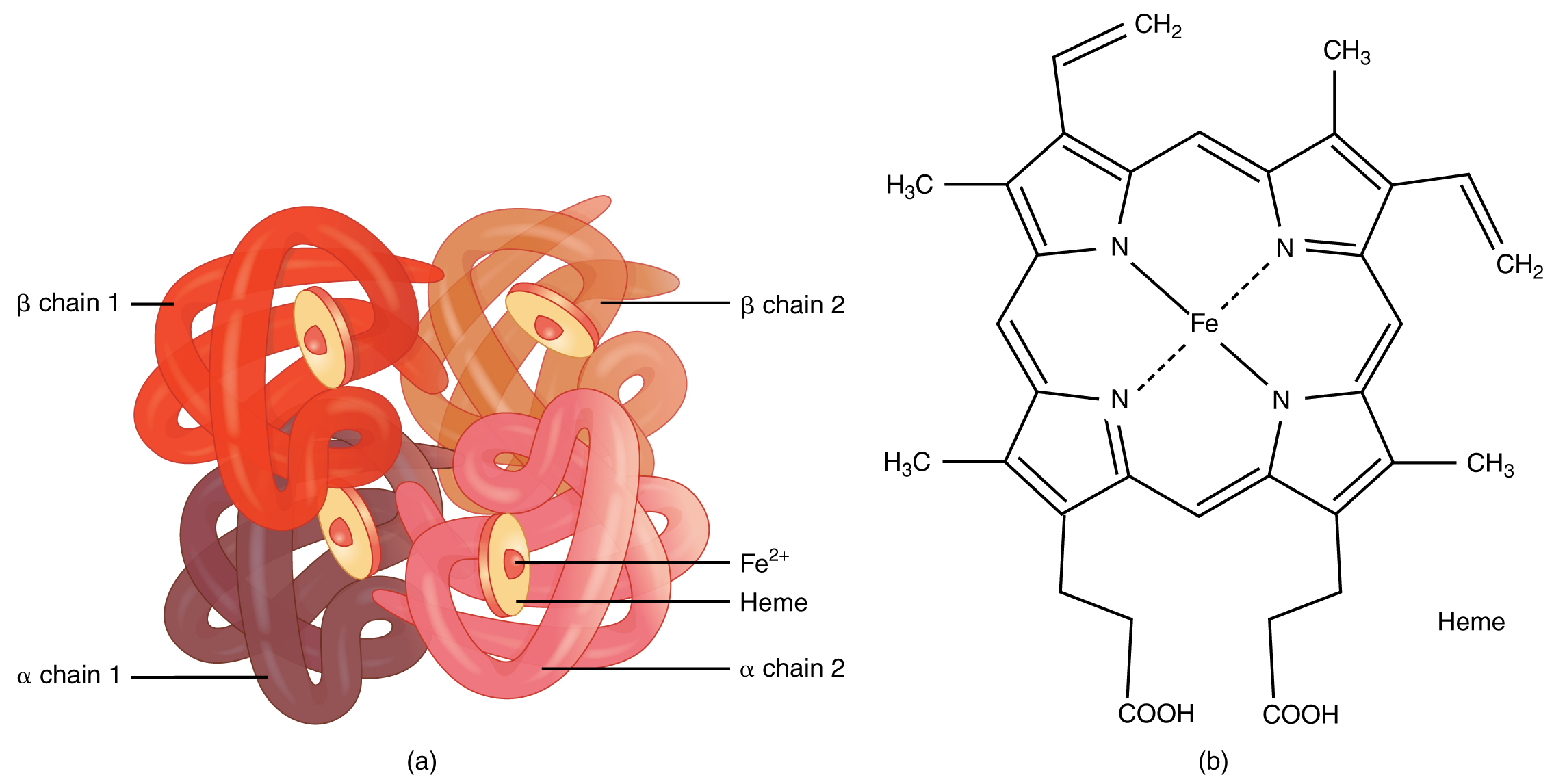
Normal hemoglobin structure

Under normal circumstances, the heme iron in ferrous state (Fe2+) is covalently bound to imidazole nitrogen of the proximal histidine (F8), and is able to bind to an oxygen molecule.

Tyrosine substitution renders structural alteration of the heme pocket and promotes spontaneous oxidation of heme iron from its ferrous state to ferric state (Fe3+) through discharge of a superoxide ion. Tyrosine can form an iron-phenolate complex with ferric iron which prevents reduction back to divalent ferrous iron. Stable covalent bond between tyrosine and Fe3+ hinders interaction between ferric iron and oxygen. Inability of ferric heme iron in binding oxygen alters oxygen affinity of ferrous heme iron in the remaining normal subunits, impeding oxygen delivery to body tissues.

Stabilization of ferric iron is done through various abnormal coordination mechanisms between mutant side chains and ferric iron.

=== Mechanisms of Different Hemoglobin M Diseases ===
Deoxygenated T (Tensed) state (low-affinity Hb quaternary structure) is stabilized in alpha-chain variants due to constraints between subunits. Ferric iron in alpha-chain variants show exceptional resistance to enzymatic reduction by metHb reductases or chemical reduction. In HbM Boston (alpha-58 [E7] His→Tyr), new Tyr (E7) coordination alters the heme plane to disrupt the normal interaction between proximal His (F8) and heme iron. In HbM Iwate (alpha-87 [F8] His→Tyr), tyrosine coordination distorts the heme position. This increases the separation between heme group and helix F within the altered alpha subunits for ferric iron stabilization.

Oxygenated R (Relaxed) state (high-affinity Hb quaternary structure) is stabilized in beta-globin variants due to relaxed constraints between subunits. In HbM Saskatoon (beta-63 [E7] His→Tyr), substitution of a larger Tyr (E7) renders close proximity with heme ferric iron hence forming a hexacoordinate iron site where transient protonation of Tyr (E7) prompts enzymatic reduction by metHb reductase. In HbM Hyde Park (beta-92 [F8] His→Tyr), heme loss and instability with nearby residue reconstruction contribute to its pathophysiology.

Physiological properties of non-mutant subunits within the mutant Hb tetramer differ. Normal alpha subunits in beta-chain variants (HbM Saskatoon and HbM Hyde Park) exhibit significant cooperativity and Bohr effect, displaying an increased oxygen affinity. Normal beta subunits in alpha-chain variants (HbM Boston and HbM Iwate) exhibit reduced cooperativity and Bohr effect, displaying a decreased oxygen affinity. Hence, lower circulating oxidized Hb is observed in beta-chain variants than that in alpha-chain variants.

For HbM Milwaukee-1 (beta-67 [E11] Val→Glu), proximity of anionic glutamate to the heme iron favors the autoxidation of ferrous iron and stabilization of ferric iron by direct coordination to its sixth coordinate position. This decreases oxygen affinity.

== Diagnosis ==
Cyanosis caused by hemoglobin M disease is often mistaken as cardiac or pulmonary defects. Correct diagnosis is important to prevent unnecessary invasive procedures such as cardiac catheterization and mechanical ventilation.

=== Biochemical Testing ===
Exposure of venous blood samples to pure oxygen can be used to differentiate cyanosis caused by metHb from cardiopulmonary cyanosis or other cyanosis caused by low-O2 affinity Hbs. Cyanotic patients with methemoglobinemia display brownish blood while purple deoxyhemoglobin becomes bright red oxyhemoglobin in other cases. Addition of potassium cyanide (KCN) can be used to further distinguish hemoglobin M disease from other subtypes of methemoglobinemia and sulfhemoglobinemia. For sulfhemoglobinemia, sulfHb is inert to cyanide and shows no colour change. Hemolysates containing metHb with wild-type globin chains turn red immediately. The color change in hemolysates containing metHb with mutated globin chains is slower and the conversion rate for different HbM variants may vary.

=== Hemoglobin Electrophoresis ===
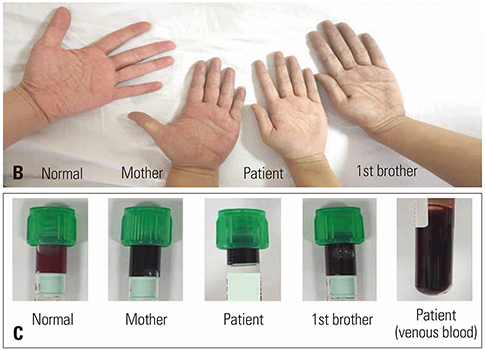
Differences in skin colors and arterial blood colors between a normal individual and patients

It provides qualitative analysis by identification of abnormal Hb variants. Addition of KCN before electrophoresis converts all Hb types into metHb to prevent result misinterpretation due to iron state differences. Normal and abnormal Hb variants are separated by electric current, and the observed differences in migration indicate the substitution of the amino acid. For clear separation, hemoglobin electrophoresis should be performed on agar gel at pH 7.1. Under alkaline conditions, HbM migrates slightly slower than HbA. Further confirmatory testing can be performed by high-performance liquid chromatography (HPLC) to provide quantification of the Hb fractions.

=== Ultraviolet-Visible Wavelength Light Spectroscopy ===
Spectral absorption of the hemolysate at various wavelengths can be used for diagnosis. Compared with normal blood, a unique absorption range of HbM variants can be seen. HbM exhibits a specific light absorption pattern, shown by visible peaks at 510 and 630 nm. This explains the formation of chocolate-brown blood. CO-oximetry using multiple wavelengths is preferred over pulse oximetry in metHb detection. Pulse oximetry only uses two distinct wavelengths of 660 and 940 nm which can be misleading.

=== DNA-Based Globin Gene Analysis ===
Automated fluorescence-based DNA sequence analysis is applied in the routine diagnosis of hemoglobinopathies as it provides a rapid and reliable result for the identification of specific globin gene mutations. It is used as a further confirmatory test.

== Treatment ==
Hemoglobin M disease is often not life-threatening and treatment is not necessary. There is no existing effective treatment, including methylene blue (MB) and ascorbic acid used in treating acquired methemoglobinemia. MB is an oxidant and it is not used to treat hemoglobin M disease. They are prone to develop symptomatic methemoglobinemia given further exposure to oxidants.
