= Blue people =

Blue people may refer to:

- Methemoglobinemia, a disorder that can turn skin blue
  - the Blue Fugates, an Appalachian family with congenital methemoglobinemia
- Cyanosis, a general medical condition that can turn skin blue
  - Blue baby syndrome, cyanosis in babies
- A name for the Tuareg people, from their traditional clothing
- A term in the United States to refer members of the Democratic Party (United States)
- People with argyria, a condition that turns the skin blue
- the Blue Man Group, a performing group that performs in blue makeup

== Religion ==
- Hindu deities such as Vishnu and Krishna are often depicted as having blue skin

== In fiction ==
- The Smurfs, small blue humanoid creatures from the cartoon and comic series of the same name
- The Na'vi, a fictional species that live on the planet Pandora in the 2009 film Avatar
- Doctor Manhattan, a character from the comic book series Watchmen and related media
- Donkey Skin (film) features servants with blue skin in one kingdom and red skin in the neighbour kingdom

== See also ==
- Blue skin (disambiguation)
