= Blue skin =

Blue skin may refer to:

- Argyria, a condition caused by the ingestion of elemental silver, silver dust or silver compounds
- Methemoglobinemia, the presence of excessive levels of methemoglobin in the blood
- Cyanosis, a change of skin color due to decreased amounts of oxygenated hemoglobin
  - Blue baby syndrome, cyanosis in babies
- Purpura, hemorrhagic lesions caused by bleeding underneath the skin
  - Bruise
  - Petechia

== See also ==
- Blueskin (disambiguation)
- Blue people (disambiguation)
