= Phenazopyridine =

Urinary analgesic

Clinical data
- Trade names: Pyridium
- AHFS/Drugs.com: Monograph
- MedlinePlus: a682231
- License data: US DailyMed: Phenazopyridine
- Routes of administration: By mouth
- ATC code: G04BX06 (WHO)

Legal status
- Legal status: US: OTC

Identifiers
- IUPAC name: 3-phenyldiazenylpyridine-2,6-diamine
- CAS Number: 94-78-0
- PubChem CID: 4756
- IUPHAR/BPS: 7616
- DrugBank: DB01438
- ChemSpider: 4592
- UNII: K2J09EMJ52
- KEGG: D08346
- ChEMBL: ChEMBL1242
- CompTox Dashboard (EPA): DTXSID1023445
- ECHA InfoCard: 100.002.149

Chemical and physical data
- Formula: C_{11}H_{11}N_{5}
- Molar mass: 213.244 g·mol^{−1}
- 3D model (JSmol): Interactive image
- SMILES: NC1=NC(N)=CC=C1/N=N/C2=CC=CC=C2

Phenazopyridine is a medication which, when excreted by the kidneys into the urine, has a local analgesic effect on the urinary tract. It is often used to help with the pain, irritation, or urgency caused by urinary tract infections, surgery, or injury to the urinary tract.

In 2023, it was the 275th most commonly prescribed medication in the United States, with more than 800,000 prescriptions.

== Medical uses ==
Phenazopyridine is prescribed for its local analgesic effects on the urinary tract. It is sometimes used in conjunction with an antibiotic or other anti-infective medication at the beginning of treatment to help provide immediate symptomatic relief. Phenazopyridine does not treat infections or injury; it is only used for symptom relief during a UTI, following surgery, or injury to the urinary tract. It is recommended that it be used for no longer than the first two days of antibacterial treatment, as there is insufficient evidence to suggest that it provides a greater benefit than antibacterial treatment alone at this point. UTI therapy should be limited to one to two days.

Phenazopyridine is prescribed for other cases requiring relief from irritation or discomfort during urination; for example, after the use of an in-dwelling Foley catheter, endoscopic (cystoscopy) procedures, or after urethral, prostate, or urinary bladder surgeries that may result in irritation of the epithelial lining of the urinary tract.

== Side effects ==
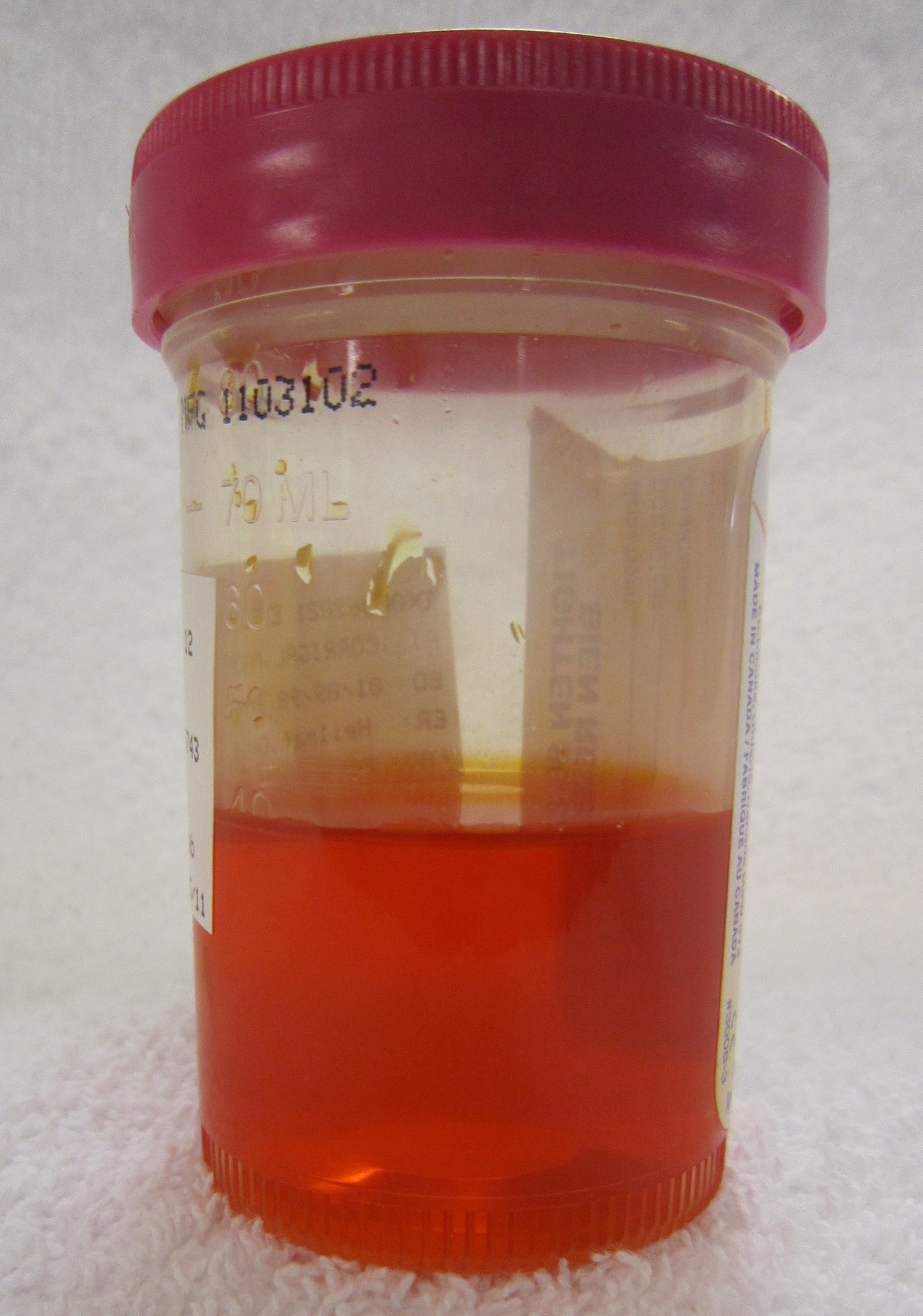
The characteristic orange-colored urine after taking phenazopyridine

Phenazopyridine produces a vivid color change in urine, typically to a dark orange to reddish color. This effect is common and harmless and indeed a key indicator of the presence of the medication in the body. Users of phenazopyridine are warned not to wear contact lenses, as phenazopyridine has been known to permanently discolor them. Furthermore, it tends to leave an orange-yellow stain on surfaces (including fabrics) it comes in contact with. These color changes can be concerning for patients, who may mistake them for the presence of blood in the urine.

Phenazopyridine can cause headaches, upset stomach (especially when not taken with food), or dizziness. Less frequently it can cause a noticeable yellowish pigment change in the skin or eyes. This is due to a depressed excretion via the kidneys causing a buildup of the medication in the skin, and normally indicates a need to discontinue usage. Other such side effects include fever, confusion, shortness of breath, skin rash, and swelling of the face, fingers, feet, or legs. Long-term use may cause yellowing of nails.

Phenazopyridine should be avoided by people with glucose-6-phosphate dehydrogenase deficiency, because it can cause hemolysis (destruction of red blood cells) due to oxidative stress. It has been reported to cause methemoglobinemia after overdose and even normal doses. In at least one case, the patient had pre-existing low levels of methemoglobin reductase, which likely predisposed her to the condition. It has also been reported to cause sulfhemoglobinemia.

Phenazopyridine is an azo dye. Other azo dyes, which were previously used in textiles, printing, and plastic manufacturing, have been implicated as carcinogens that can cause bladder cancer. While phenazopyridine has never been shown to cause cancer in humans, evidence from animal models suggests that it is potentially carcinogenic.

=== Pregnancy ===
This medication has shown no adverse events in animal models, but no human trials have been conducted. It is not known if phenazopyridine is excreted in breast milk.

== Pharmacokinetics ==
The full pharmacokinetic properties of phenazopyridine have not been determined. It has mostly been studied in animal models, but they may not be very representative of humans. Rat models have shown its half-life to be 7.35 hours, and 40% is metabolized hepatically (by the liver).

== Mechanism of action ==
Phenazopyridine's mechanism of action is not well known, and only basic information on its interaction with the body is available. It is known that the chemical has a direct topical analgesic effect on the mucosa lining of the urinary tract. It is rapidly excreted by the kidneys directly into the urine. Hydroxylation is the major form of metabolism in humans, and the azo bond is usually not cleaved. On the order of 65% of an oral dose will be secreted directly into the urine chemically unchanged.

== Brand names ==
In addition to its generic form, phenazopyridine is distributed under the following brand names:

- Azo-Maximum Strength
- Azo-Standard
- Baridium
- Nefrecil
- Nexurin
- Phenazalgin
- Phenazo
- Phenazodine
- Pyridiate
- Pyridium
- Pyridium Plus
- Sedural
- Uricalm
- Uristat
- Uropyrine
- Urodine
- Urogesic
- Urovit
