= Hemichrome =

A hemichrome (FeIII) is a form of low-spin methemoglobin (metHb). Hemichromes, which precede the denaturation processes of hemoglobin (Hb), are mainly produced by partially denaturated hemoglobins and form histidine complexes. Hemichromes are usually associated with blood disorders.

== Types of hemichromes ==
Hemichromes can be classified in two main categories: reversible and irreversible.

Reversible hemichromes (Hch-1) have the ability to return to their native formation (hemoglobin). Some hemichromes can be reduced to the high-spin state of deoxyhemoglobin, while others are first being reduced to hemochromes (FeII) and then to deoxyhemoglobin through anaerobic dialysis. Photolysis, in the presence of oxygen from CO and its reaction with the hemochrome, can quickly convert a hemichrome to oxyhemoglobin (HbO2). Irreversible hemichromes (Hch-2) cannot be converted to their native form.

Both the reversible and irreversible hemichromes have a similar rate during proteolytic degradation and they both have a lower percentage of alpha helixes.

== Hemichrome in bloodstains ==
Upon blood exiting the body, hemoglobin in blood transits from bright red to dark brown, which is attributed to oxidation of oxy-hemoglobin (HbO_{2}) to methemoglobin (met-Hb) and ending up in hemichrome (HC). For forensic purposes, the fractions of HbO_{2}, met-Hb and HC in a bloodstain can be used for age determination of bloodstains when measured with Reflectance Spectroscopy .

== Hemichrome stability ==
Hemichromes form an insoluble macromolecule (macromolecular aggregate) by copolymerization with the cytoplasm of band 3. Covalent bonds reinforce the aggregate interactions of the hemichromes which are accumulated on the surface of the membrane. However, hemichromes are less stable than their native form.

== Normal formation ==
Hemoglobin A in humans can form hemichromes even under physiological conditions as a result of pH and temperature alterations, and the autoxidation of oxyhemoglobin. Hemichrome formation, followed by a band 3 clustering and the formation of Heinz bodies, can take place during the physiological clearance of damaged red blood cells. The difference between a normal red blood cell (RBC) and a red blood cell with unstable hemoglobin (such as in the case of hemolytic anaemia) is that, in a normal RBC, the formation of Heinz bodies is significantly delayed. In cells with unstable hemoglobin, hemichromes are formed soon after the cell has been released into the bloodstream and they precipitate on the membrane's surface.

== Abnormal formation ==
When hemoglobin is exposed to certain conditions, reversible or irreversible hemichromes are formed.

Reversible hemichrome formation occurs in the presence of:

- Fatty acids
- Aliphatic alcohol (n-butanol)
- Dehydration
- High concentration of glycerol
- Polyethylene glycol

Irreversible hemichrome formation occurs in the presence of:

- Phenylhydrazine
- Sodium dodecyl sulphate (SDS)
