= Rete mirabile =

Complex of arteries and veins lying very close to each other

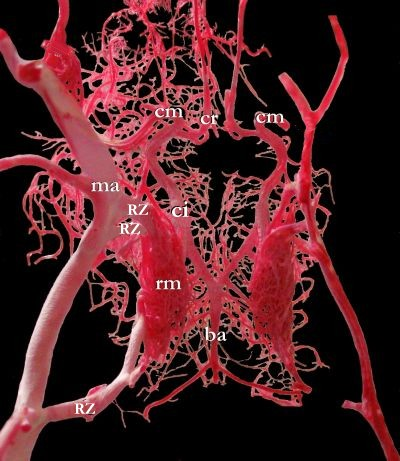
- Rete mirabile of a sheep

Identifiers
- TA98: A12.0.00.013
- TA2: 3928
- FMA: 76728

A rete mirabile (Latin for 'wonderful net'; pl.: retia mirabilia) is a complex of arteries and veins lying very close to each other, found in some vertebrates, mainly warm-blooded ones. The rete mirabile utilizes countercurrent blood flow within the net (blood flowing in opposite directions) to act as a countercurrent exchanger. It exchanges heat, ions, or gases between vessel walls so that the two bloodstreams within the rete maintain a gradient with respect to temperature, or concentration of gases or solutes. This term was coined by Galen.

== Effectiveness ==
The effectiveness of retia is primarily determined by how readily the heat, ions, or gases can be exchanged. For a given length, they are most effective with respect to gases or heat, then small ions, and decreasingly so with respect to other substances.

The retia can provide for extremely efficient exchanges. In bluefin tuna, for example, nearly all of the metabolic heat in the venous blood is transferred to the arterial blood, thus conserving muscle temperature; that heat exchange approaches 99% efficiency.

== Birds ==
In birds with webbed feet, retia mirabilia in the legs and feet transfer heat from the outgoing (hot) blood in the arteries to the incoming (cold) blood in the veins. The effect of this biological heat exchanger is that the internal temperature of the feet is much closer to the ambient temperature, thus reducing heat loss. Penguins also have them in the flippers and nasal passages.

Seabirds distill seawater using countercurrent exchange in a so-called salt gland with a rete mirabile. The gland secretes highly concentrated brine stored near the nostrils above the beak. The bird then "sneezes" the brine out. As freshwater is not usually available in their environments, some seabirds, such as pelicans, petrels, albatrosses, gulls and terns, possess this gland, which allows them to drink the salty water from their environments while they are hundreds of miles away from land.

== Fish ==
Fish have evolved retia mirabilia multiple times to raise the temperature (endothermy) or the oxygen concentration of a body part above the ambient level.

In many fish, a rete mirabile helps fill the swim bladder with oxygen, increasing the fish's buoyancy. The rete mirabile is an essential part of the system that pumps dissolved oxygen from a low partial pressure (${P_{\rm O_2}}$) of 0.2 atmospheres into a gas filled bladder that is at a pressure of hundreds of atmospheres. A rete mirabile called the choroid rete mirabile is found in most living teleosts and raises the ${P_{\rm O_2}}$ of the retina. The higher supply of oxygen allows the teleost retina to be thick and have few blood vessels thereby increasing its sensitivity to light. In addition to raising the ${P_{\rm O_2}}$, the choroid rete has evolved to raise the temperature of the eye in some teleosts and sharks.

A countercurrent exchange system is utilized between the venous and arterial capillaries. Lowering the pH levels in the venous capillaries causes oxygen to unbind from blood hemoglobin because of the Root effect. This causes an increase in venous blood oxygen partial pressure, allowing the oxygen to diffuse through the capillary membrane and into the arterial capillaries, where oxygen is still sequestered to hemoglobin. The cycle of diffusion continues until the partial pressure of oxygen in the arterial capillaries exceeds that in the swim bladder. At this point, the dissolved oxygen in the arterial capillaries diffuses into the swim bladder via the gas gland.

The rete mirabile allows for an increase in muscle temperature in regions where this network of vein and arteries is found. The fish is able to thermoregulate certain areas of its body. Additionally, this increase in temperature leads to an increase in basal metabolic temperature. The fish is now able to split ATP at a higher rate and ultimately can swim faster.

The opah utilizes retia mirabilia to conserve heat, making it the newest addition to the list of regionally endothermic fish. Blood traveling through capillaries in the gills must carry cold blood due to their exposure to cold water, but retia mirabilia in the opah's gills are able to transfer heat from warm blood in arterioles coming from the heart that heats this colder blood in arterioles leaving the gills. The huge pectoral muscles of the opah, which generate most of the body heat, are thus able to control the temperature of the rest of the body.

== Mammals ==
In mammals, an elegant rete mirabile in the efferent arterioles of juxtamedullary glomeruli is important in maintaining the hypertonicity of the renal medulla. It is the hypertonicity of this zone, resorbing water osmotically from the renal collecting ducts as they exit the kidney, that makes possible the excretion of a hypertonic urine and maximum conservation of body water.

Vascular retia mirabilia are also found in the limbs of a range of mammals. These reduce the temperature in the extremities. Some of these probably function to prevent heat loss in cold conditions by reducing the temperature gradient between the limb and the environment. Others reduce the temperature of the testes increasing their productivity. In the neck of the dog, a rete mirabile protects the brain when the body overheats during hunting; the venous blood is cooled down by panting before entering the net.

Retia mirabilia also occur frequently in mammals that burrow, dive or have arboreal lifestyles that involve clinging with the limbs for lengthy periods. In the last case, slow-moving arboreal mammals such as sloths, lorises and arboreal anteaters possess retia of the highly developed type known as vascular bundles. The structure and function of these mammalian retia mirabilia are reviewed by O'Dea (1990).

The ancient physician Galen mistakenly thought that humans also have a rete mirabile in the neck, apparently based on dissection of sheep and misidentifying the results with the human carotid sinus, and ascribed important properties to it; it fell to Berengario da Carpi first, and then to Vesalius to demonstrate the error.

== See also ==
- Pampiniform plexus, a countercurrent heat-exchanging structure in the spermatic cord
