= Myo-Inositol trispyrophosphate =

myo-Inositol trispyrophosphate

Names
- Other names: ITPP; myo-Inositol cyclic 1,2:3,4:5,6-tris(dihydrogen pyrophosphate); myo-Inositol cyclic 1,2:3,4:5,6-tris(P,P'-dihydrogen diphosphate); Hexahydrobis[1,3,5,2,4]trioxadiphosphepino[6,7-g:6',7'-i][1,3,5,2,4]benzotrioxadiphosphepine-2,4,7,9,12,14-hexol 2,4,7,9,12,14-hexaoxide

Identifiers
CAS Number	623552-11-4
3D model (JSmol)	Interactive image
ChemSpider	8615402
MeSH	C516441
PubChem CID	10439981
- InChI: InChI=1S/C6H12O21P6/c7-28(8)19-1-2(20-29(9,10)25-28)4-6(24-33(17,18)27-32(15,16)23-4)5-3(1)21-30(11,12)26-31(13,14)22-5/h1-6H,(H,7,8)(H,9,10)(H,11,12)(H,13,14)(H,15,16)(H,17,18) Key: HEDKSUBRULAYNO-UHFFFAOYSA-N; InChI=1S/C6H12O21P6/c7-28(8)19-1-2(20-29(9,10)25-28)4-6(24-33(17,18)27-32(15,16)23-4)5-3(1)21-30(11,12)26-31(13,14)22-5/h1-6H,(H,7,8)(H,9,10)(H,11,12)(H,13,14)(H,15,16)(H,17,18) Key: HEDKSUBRULAYNO-UHFFFAOYSA-N
- SMILES: C12C(C3C(C4C1OP(=O)(OP(=O)(O4)O)O)OP(=O)(OP(=O)(O3)O)O)OP(=O)(OP(=O)(O2)O)O

Properties
Chemical formula	C_{6}H_{12}O_{21}P_{6}
Molar mass	605.984 g·mol^{−1}
- Except where otherwise noted, data are given for materials in their standard state (at 25 °C [77 °F], 100 kPa). Infobox references

myo-Inositol trispyrophosphate (ITPP) is an inositol phosphate, a pyrophosphate, a drug candidate, and a putative performance-enhancing substance, which exerts its biological effects by increasing tissue oxygenation.

== Chemistry ==
ITPP is a pyrophosphate derivative of phytic acid with the molecular formula C_{6}H_{12}O_{21}P_{6}.

== Biological effects ==
ITPP is a membrane-permeant allosteric regulator of hemoglobin that mildly reduces its oxygen-binding affinity, which shifts the oxygen-hemoglobin dissociation curve to the right and thereby increases oxygen release from the blood into tissue. Phytic acid, in contrast, is not membrane-permeant due to its charge distribution.

Rodent studies in vivo demonstrated increased tissue oxygenation and dose-dependent increases in endurance during physical exercise, in both healthy mice and transgenic mice expressing a heart failure phenotype.

The substance is believed to have a high potential for use in athletic doping, and liquid chromatography–mass spectrometry tests have been developed to detect ITPP in urine tests. Its use as a performance-enhancing substance in horse racing has also been suspected and similar tests have been developed for horses

ITPP has been studied for potential adjuvant use in the treatment of cancer in conjunction with chemotherapy, due to its effects in reducing tissue hypoxia. Human clinical trials were registered in 2014 under the compound number OXY111A. The substance has also been examined in the context of other illnesses involving hypoxia, such as cardiovascular disease and dementia

== See also ==
- Phytic acid
- Inositol
- Inositol phosphate
- Inositol trisphosphate
- myo-Inositol
