= Bohr effect =

Effect of carbon dioxide on haemoglobin

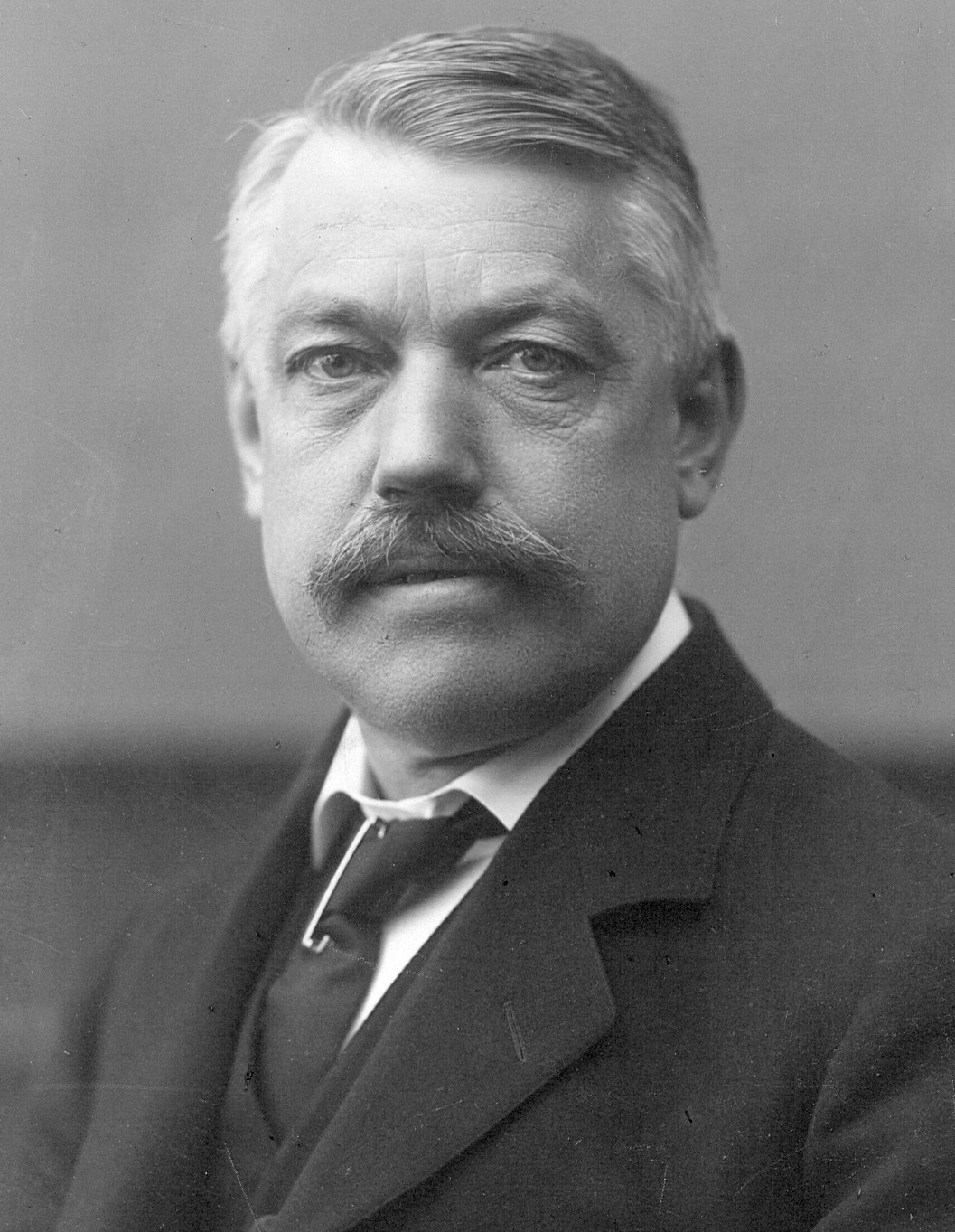
Christian Bohr, who was credited with the discovery of the effect in 1904.

The Bohr effect is a phenomenon first described in 1904 by the Danish physiologist Christian Bohr (who was also the father of the physicist and Nobel laureate Niels Bohr). Hemoglobin's oxygen binding affinity (see oxygen–haemoglobin dissociation curve) is inversely related both to acidity and to the concentration of carbon dioxide. That is, the Bohr effect refers to the shift in the oxygen dissociation curve caused by changes in the concentration of carbon dioxide or the pH of the environment. Since carbon dioxide reacts with water to form carbonic acid, an increase in CO_{2} results in a decrease in blood pH, resulting in hemoglobin proteins releasing their load of oxygen. Conversely, a decrease in carbon dioxide provokes an increase in pH, which results in hemoglobin picking up more oxygen.

== Experimental discovery ==
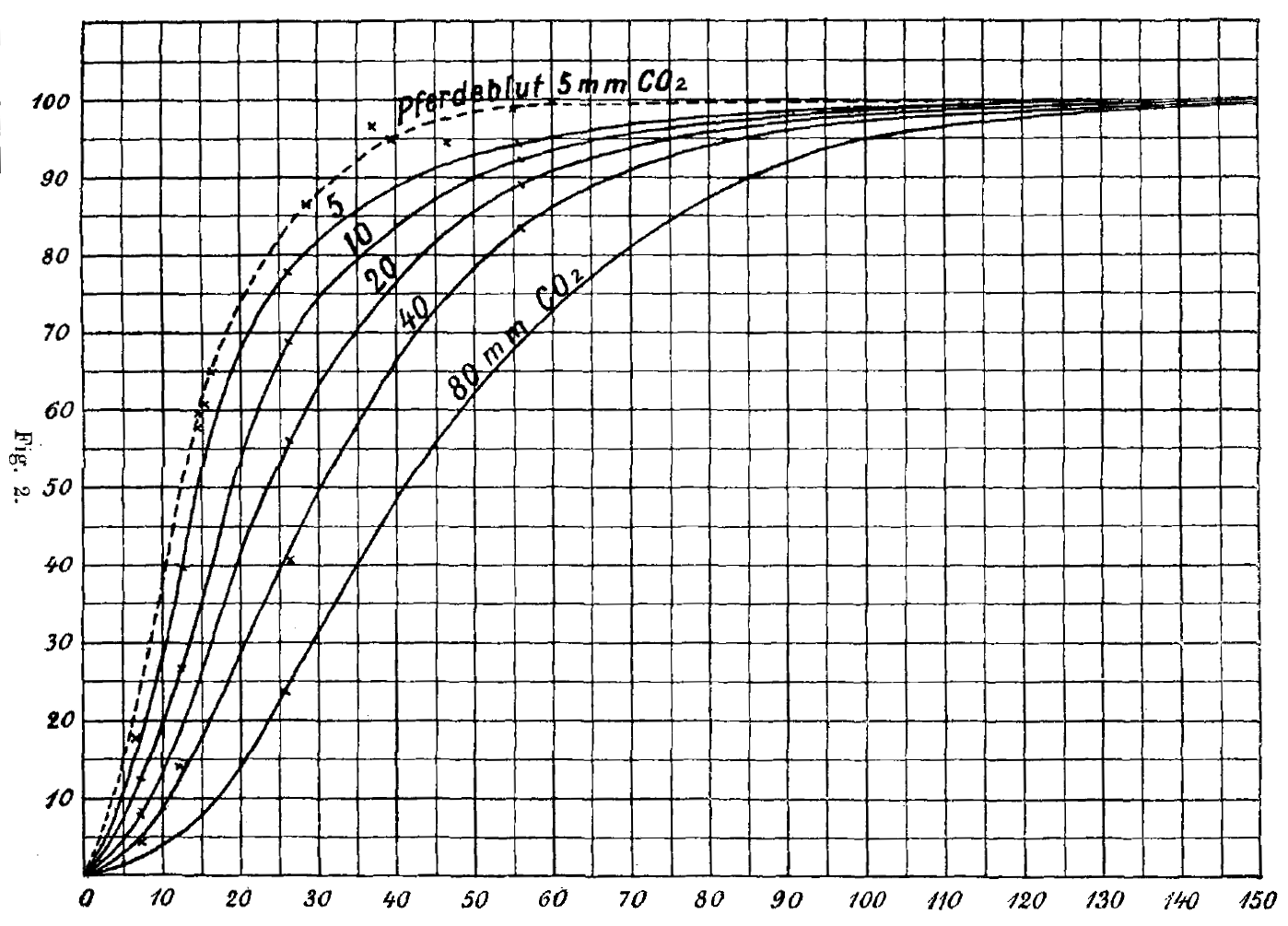
The original dissociation curves from Bohr's experiments in the first description of the Bohr effect, showing a decrease in oxygen affinity as the partial pressure of carbon dioxide increases. This is also one of the first examples of cooperative binding. X-axis: oxygen partial pressure in mmHg, Y-axis % oxy-hemoglobin. The curves were obtained using whole dog blood, with the exception of the dashed curve, for which horse blood was used.

In the early 1900s, Christian Bohr was a professor at the University of Copenhagen in Denmark, already well known for his work in the field of respiratory physiology. He had spent the last two decades studying the solubility of oxygen, carbon dioxide, and other gases in various liquids, and had conducted extensive research on haemoglobin and its affinity for oxygen. In 1903, he began working closely with Karl Hasselbalch and August Krogh, two of his associates at the university, in an attempt to experimentally replicate the work of Gustav von Hüfner, using whole blood instead of haemoglobin solution. Hüfner had suggested that the oxygen-haemoglobin binding curve was hyperbolic in shape, but after extensive experimentation, the Copenhagen group determined that the curve was in fact sigmoidal. Furthermore, in the process of plotting out numerous dissociation curves, it soon became apparent that high partial pressures of carbon dioxide caused the curves to shift to the right. Further experimentation while varying the CO_{2} concentration quickly provided conclusive evidence, confirming the existence of what would soon become known as the Bohr effect.

=== Controversy ===
There is some more debate over whether Bohr was actually the first to discover the relationship between CO_{2} and oxygen affinity, or whether the Russian physiologist Bronislav Verigo beat him to it, allegedly discovering the effect in 1898, six years before Bohr. While this has never been proven, Verigo did in fact publish a paper on the haemoglobin-CO_{2} relationship in 1892. His proposed model was flawed, and Bohr harshly criticized it in his own publications.

Another challenge to Bohr's discovery comes from within his lab. Though Bohr was quick to take full credit, his associate Krogh, who invented the apparatus used to measure gas concentrations in the experiments, maintained throughout his life that he himself had actually been the first to demonstrate the effect. Though there is some evidence to support this, retroactively changing the name of a well-known phenomenon would be extremely impractical, so it remains known as the Bohr effect.

== Physiological role ==
The Bohr effect increases the efficiency of oxygen transportation through the blood. After hemoglobin binds to oxygen in the lungs due to the high oxygen concentrations, the Bohr effect facilitates its release in the tissues, particularly those tissues in most need of oxygen. When a tissue's metabolic rate increases, so does its carbon dioxide waste production. When released into the bloodstream, carbon dioxide forms bicarbonate and protons through the following reaction:

$$\ce{CO2 + H2O <=> H2CO3 <=> H+ + HCO3^-}$$

Although this reaction usually proceeds very slowly, the enzyme carbonic anhydrase (which is present in red blood cells) drastically speeds up the conversion to bicarbonate and protons. This causes the pH of the blood to decrease, which promotes the dissociation of oxygen from hemoglobin, and allows the surrounding tissues to obtain enough oxygen to meet their demands. In areas where oxygen concentration is high, such as the lungs, binding of oxygen causes haemoglobin to release protons, which recombine with bicarbonate to eliminate carbon dioxide during exhalation. These opposing protonation and deprotonation reactions occur in equilibrium resulting in little overall change in blood pH.

The Bohr effect enables the body to adapt to changing conditions and makes it possible to supply extra oxygen to tissues that need it the most. For example, when muscles are undergoing strenuous activity, they require large amounts of oxygen to conduct cellular respiration, which generates CO_{2} (and therefore HCO_{3}^{−} and H^{+}) as byproducts. These waste products lower the pH of the blood, which increases oxygen delivery to the active muscles. Carbon dioxide is not the only molecule that can trigger the Bohr effect. If muscle cells aren't receiving enough oxygen for cellular respiration, they resort to lactic acid fermentation, which releases lactic acid as a byproduct. This increases the acidity of the blood far more than CO_{2} alone, which reflects the cells' even greater need for oxygen. In fact, under anaerobic conditions, muscles generate lactic acid so quickly that pH of the blood passing through the muscles will drop to around 7.2, which causes haemoglobin to begin releasing roughly 10% more oxygen.

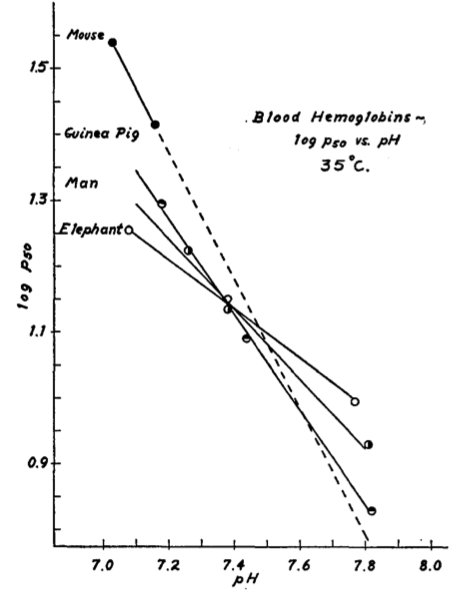
The magnitude of the Bohr effect is given by ${\scriptstyle \Delta \log (P_{50}) \over \Delta \text{pH}}$, which is the slope on this graph. A steeper slope means a stronger Bohr effect.

=== Strength of the effect and body size ===
The magnitude of the Bohr effect is usually given by the slope of the $\log (P_{50})$ vs $\text{pH}$ curve where, P_{50} refers to the partial pressure of oxygen when 50% of haemoglobin's binding sites are occupied. The slope is denoted: ${\scriptstyle \Delta \log (P_{50}) \over \Delta \text{pH}}$ where $\Delta$ denotes change. That is, $\Delta \log (P_{50})$ denotes the change in $\log (P_{50})$ and $\Delta \text{pH}$ the change in $\text{pH}$. Bohr effect strength exhibits an inverse relationship with the size of an organism: the magnitude increases as size and weight decreases. For example, mice possess a very strong Bohr effect, with a ${\scriptstyle \Delta \log (P_{50}) \over \Delta \text{pH}}$ value of -0.96, which requires relatively minor changes in H^{+} or CO_{2} concentrations, while elephants require much larger changes in concentration to achieve a much weaker effect $\left({\scriptstyle \Delta \log (P_{50}) \over \Delta \text{pH}} = -0.38\right)$.

== Mechanism ==
=== Allosteric interactions ===
Haemoglobin changes conformation from a high-affinity R state (oxygenated) to a low-affinity T state (deoxygenated) to improve oxygen uptake and delivery.

The Bohr effect hinges around allosteric interactions between the hemes of the haemoglobin tetramer, a mechanism first proposed by Max Perutz in 1970. Haemoglobin exists in two conformations: a high-affinity R state and a low-affinity T state. When oxygen concentration levels are high, as in the lungs, the R state is favored, enabling the maximum amount of oxygen to be bound to the hemes. In the capillaries, where oxygen concentration levels are lower, the T state is favored, in order to facilitate the delivery of oxygen to the tissues. The Bohr effect is dependent on this allostery, as increases in CO_{2} and H^{+} help stabilize the T state and ensure greater oxygen delivery to muscles during periods of elevated cellular respiration. This is evidenced by the fact that myoglobin, a monomer with no allostery, does not exhibit the Bohr effect. Haemoglobin mutants with weaker allostery may exhibit a reduced Bohr effect. For example, in Hiroshima variant haemoglobinopathy, allostery in haemoglobin is reduced, and the Bohr effect is diminished. As a result, during periods of exercise, the mutant haemoglobin has a higher affinity for oxygen and tissue may suffer minor oxygen starvation.

=== T-state stabilization ===
When hemoglobin is in its T state, the N-terminal amino groups of the α-subunits and the C-terminal histidine of the β-subunits are protonated, giving them a positive charge and allowing these residues to participate in ionic interactions with carboxyl groups on nearby residues. These interactions help hold the haemoglobin in the T state. Decreases in pH (increases in acidity) stabilize this state even more, since a decrease in pH makes these residues even more likely to be protonated, strengthening the ionic interactions. In the R state, the ionic pairings are absent, meaning that the R state's stability increases when the pH increases, as these residues are less likely to stay protonated in a more basic environment. The Bohr effect works by simultaneously destabilizing the high-affinity R state and stabilizing the low-affinity T state, which leads to an overall decrease in oxygen affinity. This can be visualized on an oxygen-haemoglobin dissociation curve by shifting the whole curve to the right.

Carbon dioxide can also react directly with the N-terminal amino groups to form carbamates, according to the following reaction:

$$\ce{R-NH2 + CO2 <=> R-NH-COO^- + H+}$$

CO_{2} forms carbamates more frequently with the T state, which helps to stabilize this conformation. The process also creates protons, meaning that the formation of carbamates also contributes to the strengthening of ionic interactions, further stabilizing the T state.

== Special cases ==
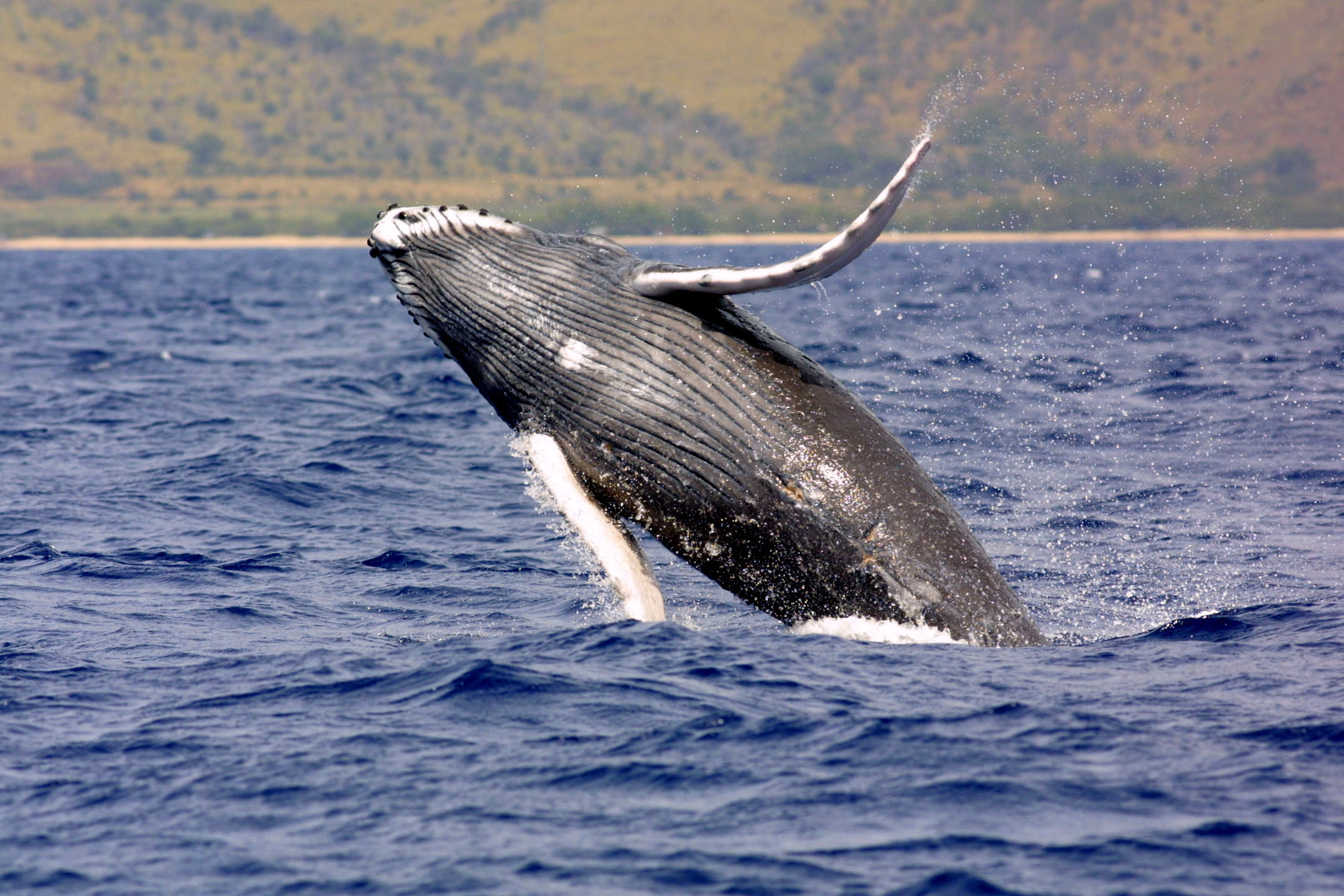
Though they are one of the largest animals on the planet, humpback whales have a Bohr effect magnitude similar to that of a guinea pig.

=== Marine mammals ===
An exception to the otherwise well-supported link between animal body size and the sensitivity of its haemoglobin to changes in pH was discovered in 1961. Based on their size and weight, many marine mammals were hypothesized to have a very low, almost negligible Bohr effect. However, when their blood was examined, this was not the case. Humpback whales weighing 41,000 kilograms had an observed ${\scriptstyle \Delta \log (P_{50}) \over \Delta \text{pH}}$ value of 0.82, which is roughly equivalent to the Bohr effect magnitude in a 0.57 kg guinea pig. This extremely strong Bohr effect is hypothesized to be one of marine mammals' many adaptations for deep, long dives, as it allows for virtually all of the bound oxygen on haemoglobin to dissociate and supply the whale's body while it is underwater. Examination of other marine mammal species supports this. In pilot whales and porpoises, which are primarily surface feeders and seldom dive for more than a few minutes, the ${\scriptstyle \Delta \log (P_{50}) \over \Delta \text{pH}}$was 0.52, comparable to a cow, which is much closer to the expected Bohr effect magnitude for animals of their size.

=== Carbon monoxide ===
Another special case of the Bohr effect occurs when carbon monoxide is present. This molecule serves as a competitive inhibitor for oxygen, and binds to haemoglobin to form carboxyhaemoglobin. Haemoglobin's affinity for CO is about 210 times stronger than its affinity for O_{2}, meaning that it is very unlikely to dissociate, and once bound, it blocks the binding of O_{2} to that subunit. At the same time, CO is structurally similar enough to O_{2} to cause carboxyhemoglobin to favor the R state, raising the oxygen affinity of the remaining unoccupied subunits. This combination significantly reduces the delivery of oxygen to the tissues of the body, which is what makes carbon monoxide so toxic. This toxicity is reduced slightly by an increase in the strength of the Bohr effect in the presence of carboxyhemoglobin. This increase is ultimately due to differences in interactions between heme groups in carboxyhemoglobin relative to oxygenated hemoglobin. It is most pronounced when the oxygen concentration is extremely low, as a last-ditch effort when the need for oxygen delivery becomes critical. However, the physiological implications of this phenomenon remain unclear.

== See also ==
- Allosteric regulation
- Haldane effect
- Root effect
- Chloride shift
