= Oxygen–hemoglobin dissociation curve =

Visual tool used to understand how human blood carries and releases oxygen

The oxygen–hemoglobin dissociation curve, also called the oxyhemoglobin dissociation curve or oxygen dissociation curve (ODC), is a curve that plots the proportion of hemoglobin in its saturated (oxygen-laden) form on the vertical axis against the prevailing oxygen tension on the horizontal axis. This curve is an important tool for understanding how our blood carries and releases oxygen. Specifically, the oxyhemoglobin dissociation curve relates oxygen saturation (SO_{2}) and partial pressure of oxygen in the blood (PO_{2}), and is determined by what is called "hemoglobin affinity for oxygen"; that is, how readily hemoglobin acquires and releases oxygen molecules into the fluid that surrounds it.

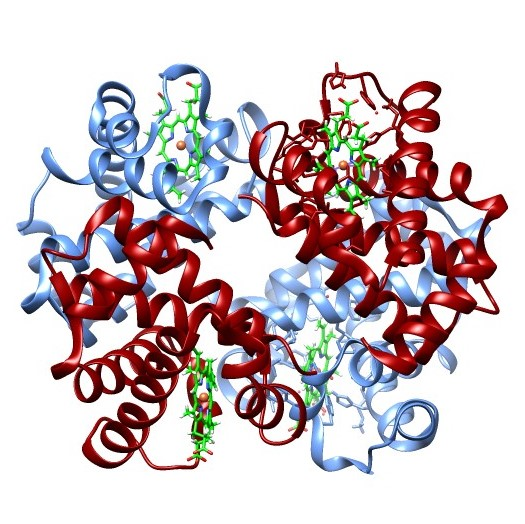
Structure of oxyhemoglobin

== Background ==
Hemoglobin (Hb) is the primary vehicle for transporting oxygen in the blood. Each hemoglobin molecule can carry four oxygen molecules. These molecules of oxygen bind to the globin chain of the heme prosthetic group.

When hemoglobin has no bound oxygen, nor bound carbon dioxide, it has the unbound conformation (shape). The binding of the first oxygen molecule induces a change in the shape of the hemoglobin that increases its ability to bind to the other three oxygen molecules.This shape is called R-State or Relaxed State.

In the presence of dissolved carbon dioxide, the pH of the blood changes; this causes another change in the shape of hemoglobin, which increases its ability to bind carbon dioxide and decreases its ability to bind oxygen. With the loss of the first oxygen molecule, and the binding of the first carbon dioxide molecule, yet another change in shape occurs, which further decreases the ability to bind oxygen, and increases the ability to bind carbon dioxide. The oxygen bound to the hemoglobin is released into the blood's plasma and absorbed into the tissues, and the carbon dioxide in the tissues is bound to the hemoglobin.

In the lungs the reverse of this process takes place. With the loss of the first oxygen molecule, the shape again changes and makes it easier to release the other three bound oxygen molecules. This shape is called the T-State or Tense State.

Oxygen is also carried dissolved in the blood's plasma, but to a much lesser degree. Hemoglobin is contained in red blood cells. Hemoglobin releases the bound oxygen when carbonic acid is present, as it is in the tissues. In the capillaries, where carbon dioxide is produced, oxygen bound to the hemoglobin is released into the blood's plasma and absorbed into the tissues.

How much of that capacity is filled by oxygen at any time is called the oxygen saturation. Expressed as a percentage, the oxygen saturation is the ratio of the amount of oxygen bound to the hemoglobin, to the oxygen-carrying capacity of the hemoglobin. The oxygen-carrying capacity of hemoglobin is determined by the type of hemoglobin present in the blood. The amount of oxygen bound to the hemoglobin at any time is related, in large part, to the partial pressure of oxygen to which the hemoglobin is exposed. In the lungs, at the alveolar–capillary interface, the partial pressure of oxygen is typically high, and therefore the oxygen binds readily to hemoglobin that is present. As the blood circulates to other body tissues in which the partial pressure of oxygen is less, the hemoglobin releases the oxygen into the tissue because the hemoglobin cannot maintain its full bound capacity of oxygen in the presence of lower oxygen partial pressures.

== Sigmoid shape ==
Hemoglobin saturation curve

The curve is usually best described by a sigmoid plot, using a formula of the kind:

$$S(t) = \frac{1}{1 + e^{-t}}.$$

A hemoglobin molecule can bind up to four oxygen molecules reversibly.

The shape of the curve results from the interaction of bound oxygen molecules with incoming molecules. The binding of the first molecule is difficult. However, this facilitates the binding of the second, third, and fourth, which is due to the induced conformational change in the structure of the hemoglobin molecule induced by the binding of an oxygen molecule.

In its simplest form, the oxyhemoglobin dissociation curve describes the relation between the partial pressure of oxygen (x axis) and the oxygen saturation (y axis). Hemoglobin's affinity for oxygen increases as successive molecules of oxygen bind. More molecules bind as the oxygen partial pressure increases until the maximum amount that can be bound is reached. As this limit is approached, very little additional binding occurs and the curve levels out as the hemoglobin becomes saturated with oxygen. Hence, the curve has a sigmoidal or S-shape. At pressures above about 60 mmHg, the standard dissociation curve is relatively flat, which means that the oxygen content of the blood does not change significantly even with large increases in the oxygen partial pressure. To get more oxygen to the tissue would require blood transfusions to increase the hemoglobin count (and hence the oxygen-carrying capacity), or supplemental oxygen that would increase the oxygen dissolved in plasma. Although binding of oxygen to hemoglobin continues to some extent for pressures about 50 mmHg, as oxygen partial pressures decrease in this steep area of the curve, the oxygen is unloaded to peripheral tissue readily as the hemoglobin's affinity diminishes. The partial pressure of oxygen in the blood at which the hemoglobin is 50% saturated, typically about 26.6 mmHg (3.5 kPa) for a healthy person, is known as the P_{50}. The P_{50} is a conventional measure of hemoglobin affinity for oxygen. In the presence of disease or other conditions that change the hemoglobin oxygen affinity and, consequently, shift the curve to the right or left, the P_{50} changes accordingly. An increased P_{50} indicates a rightward shift of the standard curve, which means that a larger partial pressure is necessary to maintain a 50% oxygen saturation. This indicates a decreased affinity. Conversely, a lower P_{50} indicates a leftward shift and a higher affinity.

The 'plateau' portion of the oxyhemoglobin dissociation curve is the range that exists at the pulmonary capillaries (minimal reduction of oxygen transported until the p(O_{2}) falls 50 mmHg).

The 'steep' portion of the oxyhemoglobin dissociation curve is the range that exists at the systemic capillaries (a small drop in systemic capillary p(O_{2}) can result in the release of large amounts of oxygen for the metabolically active cells).

To see the relative affinities of each successive oxygen as you remove/add oxygen from/to the hemoglobin from the curve, compare the relative increase/decrease in p(O_{2}) needed for the corresponding increase/decrease in s(O_{2}).

== Factors that affect the standard dissociation curve ==
The strength with which oxygen binds to hemoglobin is affected by several factors. These factors shift or reshape the oxyhemoglobin dissociation curve. A shift to the right indicates that the hemoglobin under study has a decreased affinity for oxygen. This makes it more difficult for hemoglobin to bind to oxygen (requiring a higher partial pressure of oxygen to achieve the same oxygen saturation), but it makes it easier for the hemoglobin to release oxygen bound to it. The effect of this shift of the curve increases the partial pressure of oxygen in the tissues when it is most needed, such as during exercise, or hemorrhagic shock.

In contrast, the curve is shifted to the left by the opposite of these conditions.

This shift indicates that the hemoglobin under study has an increased affinity for oxygen, so that hemoglobin binds oxygen more easily, but unloads it more reluctantly. Left shift of the curve is a sign of hemoglobin's increased affinity for oxygen (e.g. at the lungs).

Similarly, right shift shows decreased affinity, as would appear with an increase in either body temperature, hydrogen ions, 2,3-bisphosphoglycerate (2,3-BPG) concentration or carbon dioxide concentration.

Control factors	Change	Shift of curve
Temperature	↑	→
Temperature	↓	←
2,3-BPG	↑	→
2,3-BPG	↓	←
pCO_{2}	↑	→
pCO_{2}	↓	←
Acidity [H^{+}]	↑	→
Acidity [H^{+}]	↓	←

Note:

- Left shift: higher O_{2} affinity
- Right shift: lower O_{2} affinity
- fetal hemoglobin has higher O_{2} affinity than adult hemoglobin; primarily due to much-reduced affinity to 2,3-bisphosphoglycerate.

The causes of the shift to the right can be remembered using the mnemonic, "CADET, face Right!" for CO_{2}, Acid, 2,3-DPG, (Note: 2,3-DPG is an abbreviation of 2,3-DiPhosphoGlyceric acid, an obsolete name for 2,3-BPG, where B stands for Bis instead of previous Di, both meaning two.) Exercise and Temperature. Factors that move the oxygen dissociation curve to the right are those physiological states where tissues need more oxygen. For example, during exercise, muscles have a higher metabolic rate, and consequently need more oxygen, produce more carbon dioxide and lactic acid, and their temperature rises.

=== pH ===
A decrease in pH (increase in H^{+} ion concentration) shifts the standard curve to the right, while an increase shifts it to the left. This occurs because at greater H^{+} ion concentration, various amino acid residues, such as Histidine 146 exist predominantly in their protonated form allowing them to form ion pairs that stabilize deoxyhemoglobin in the T state. The T state has a lower affinity for oxygen than the R state, so with increased acidity, the hemoglobin binds less O_{2} for a given P_{O2} (and more H^{+}). This is known as the Bohr effect. A reduction in the total binding capacity of hemoglobin to oxygen (i.e. shifting the curve down, not just to the right) due to reduced pH is called the root effect. This is seen in bony fish. The binding affinity of hemoglobin to O_{2} is greatest under a relatively high pH.

=== Carbon dioxide ===
Carbon dioxide affects the curve in two ways. First, CO_{2} accumulation causes carbamino compounds to be generated through chemical interactions, which bind to hemoglobin forming carbaminohemoglobin. CO_{2} is considered an Allosteric regulation as the inhibition happens not at the binding site of hemoglobin. Second, it influences intracellular pH due to the formation of bicarbonate ions. Formation of carbaminohemoglobin stabilizes T state hemoglobin by forming ion pairs. Only about 5–10% of the total CO_{2} content of blood is transported as carbamino compounds, whereas (80–90%) is transported as bicarbonate ions and a small amount is dissolved in the plasma. The formation of a bicarbonate ion will release a proton into the plasma, decreasing pH (increased acidity), which also shifts the curve to the right as discussed above; low CO_{2} levels in the blood stream result in a high pH, and thus provide more optimal binding conditions for hemoglobin and O_{2}. This is a physiologically favored mechanism, since hemoglobin will drop off more oxygen as the concentration of carbon dioxide increases dramatically where tissue respiration is happening rapidly and oxygen is in need.

=== 2,3-BPG ===
2,3-Bisphosphoglycerate or 2,3-BPG (formerly named 2,3-diphosphoglycerate or 2,3-DPG) is an organophosphate formed in red blood cells during glycolysis and is the conjugate base of 2,3-bisphosphoglyceric acid. The production of 2,3-BPG is likely an important adaptive mechanism, because the production increases for several conditions in the presence of diminished peripheral tissue O_{2} availability, such as hypoxemia, chronic lung disease, anemia, and congestive heart failure, among others, which necessitate easier oxygen unloading in the peripheral tissue. High levels of 2,3-BPG shift the curve to the right (as in childhood), while low levels of 2,3-BPG cause a leftward shift, seen in states such as septic shock, and hypophosphataemia. In the absence of 2,3-BPG, hemoglobin's affinity for oxygen increases. 2,3-BPG acts as a heteroallosteric effector of hemoglobin, lowering hemoglobin's affinity for oxygen by binding preferentially to deoxyhemoglobin. An increased concentration of BPG in red blood cells favours formation of the T (taut), low-affinity state of hemoglobin and so the oxygen-binding curve will shift to the right.

=== Temperature ===
An increase in temperature shifts the oxygen dissociation curve to the right. When temperature is increased keeping the oxygen concentration constant, oxygen saturation decreases as the bond between oxygen and iron gets denatured. Additionally, with increased temperature, the partial pressure of oxygen increases as well. So, one will have a lesser amount of hemoglobin saturated for the same oxygen concentration but at a higher partial pressure of oxygen. Thus, any point in the curve will shift rightwards (due to increased partial pressure of oxygen) and downwards (due to weakened $\ce{Hb-O2}$bond), hence, the rightward shift of the curve.

=== Carbon monoxide ===
Hemoglobin binds with carbon monoxide 210 times more readily than with oxygen. Because of this higher affinity of hemoglobin for carbon monoxide than for oxygen, carbon monoxide is a highly successful competitor that will displace oxygen even at minuscule partial pressures. The reaction HbO_{2} + CO → HbCO + O_{2} almost irreversibly displaces the oxygen molecules forming carboxyhemoglobin; the binding of the carbon monoxide to the iron centre of hemoglobin is much stronger than that of oxygen, and the binding site remains blocked for the remainder of the life cycle of that affected red blood cell. With an increased level of carbon monoxide, a person can suffer from severe tissue hypoxia while maintaining a normal pO_{2} because carboxyhemoglobin does not carry oxygen to the tissues.

=== Effects of methemoglobinaemia ===
Methemoglobinaemia is a form of abnormal hemoglobin where the iron centre has been oxidised from the ferrous +2 oxidation state (the normal form, which on binding with oxygen changes to the ferric state) to the ferric +3 state. This causes a leftward shift in the oxygen hemoglobin dissociation curve, as any residual heme with oxygenated ferrous iron (+2 state) is unable to unload its bound oxygen into tissues (because 3+ iron impairs hemoglobin's cooperativity), thereby increasing its affinity with oxygen. However, methemoglobin has increased affinity for cyanide, and is therefore useful in the treatment of cyanide poisoning. In cases of accidental ingestion, administration of a nitrite (such as amyl nitrite) can be used to deliberately oxidise hemoglobin and raise methemoglobin levels, restoring the functioning of cytochrome oxidase. The nitrite also acts as a vasodilator, promoting the cellular supply of oxygen, and the addition of an iron salt provides for competitive binding of the free cyanide as the biochemically inert hexacyanoferrate(III) ion, [Fe(CN)_{6}]^{3−}. An alternative approach involves administering thiosulfate, thereby converting cyanide to thiocyanate, SCN^{−}, which is excreted via the kidneys. Methemoglobin is also formed in small quantities when the dissociation of oxyhemoglobin results in the formation of methemoglobin and superoxide, O_{2}^{−}, instead of the usual products. Superoxide is a free radical and causes biochemical damage, but is neutralised by the action of the enzyme superoxide dismutase.

=== Effects of ITPP ===
Myo-inositol trispyrophosphate (ITPP), also known as OXY111A, is an inositol phosphate that causes a rightward shift in the oxygen hemoglobin dissociation curve through allosteric modulation of hemoglobin within red blood cells. It is an experimental drug intended to reduce tissue hypoxia. The effects appear to last roughly as long as the affected red blood cells remain in circulation.

== Fetal hemoglobin ==
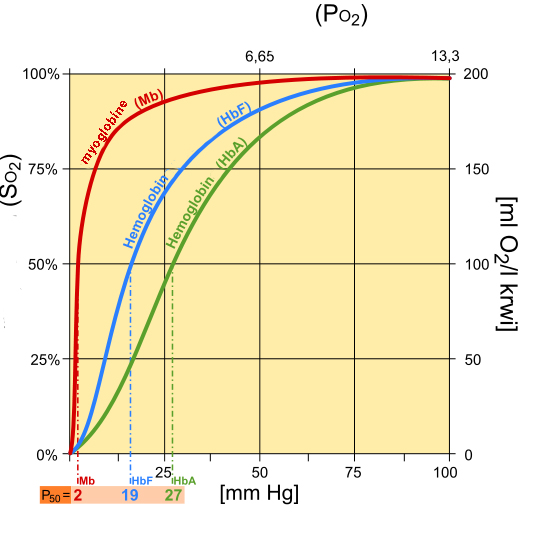
Fetal hemoglobin saturation curve

Fetal hemoglobin (HbF) is structurally different from normal adult hemoglobin (HbA), giving HbF a higher affinity for oxygen than HbA. HbF is composed of two alpha and two gamma chains, whereas HbA is composed of two alpha and two beta chains. The fetal dissociation curve is shifted to the left relative to the curve for the normal adult because of these structural differences:

In adult hemoglobin, the binding of 2,3-bisphosphoglycerate (2,3-BPG) primarily occurs with the beta chains, preventing the binding of oxygen with haemoglobin. This binding is crucial for stabilizing the deoxygenated state of hemoglobin, promoting the efficient release of oxygen to body tissues.

In fetal hemoglobin, which possesses a gamma chain instead of a beta chain, the interaction with 2,3-BPG differs because 2,3-BPG does not bind with the gamma chain as it has lower to no affinity with the gamma chain. This distinction contributes to fetal hemoglobin having a higher affinity for oxygen.

Typically, fetal arterial oxygen pressures are lower than adult arterial oxygen pressures. Hence, higher affinity to bind oxygen is required at lower levels of partial pressure in the fetus to allow diffusion of oxygen across the placenta. At the placenta, there is a higher concentration of 2,3-BPG formed, and 2,3-BPG binds readily to beta chains rather than to alpha chains. As a result, 2,3-BPG binds more strongly to adult hemoglobin, causing HbA to release more oxygen for uptake by the fetus, whose HbF is unaffected by the 2,3-BPG. HbF then delivers that bound oxygen to tissues that have even lower partial pressures where it can be released.

== See also ==
- Automated analyzer
- Bohr effect
