= Blueskin =

Blueskin may refer to:

- Blueskin (horse). one of George Washington's favorite war horses
- Blueskin Bay, an estuary and rural district in New Zealand
- The Blueskins, a band from West Yorkshire
- Blueskin seabream (Polysteganus coeruleopunctatus), a species in the Polysteganus genus
- Acacia irrorata, an Acacia species colloquially known as "blueskin"
- The Andorians in the Star Trek series
- Joseph Blake (criminal), nicknamed "Blueskin"
- A character in Gideon the Cutpurse

== See also ==
- Blue skin (disambiguation)
