= Root effect =

Physiological phenomenon in fish hemoglobin

The Root effect is a physiological phenomenon that occurs in fish hemoglobin, named after its discoverer R. W. Root. It is the phenomenon where an increased proton or carbon dioxide concentration (lower pH) lowers hemoglobin's affinity and carrying capacity for oxygen. The Root effect is to be distinguished from the Bohr effect where only the affinity to oxygen is reduced. Hemoglobins showing the Root effect show a loss of cooperativity at low pH. This results in the Hb-O_{2} dissociation curve being shifted downward and not just to the right. At low pH, hemoglobins showing the Root effect don't become fully oxygenated even at oxygen tensions up to 20 kPa. This effect allows hemoglobin in fish with swim bladders to unload oxygen into the swim bladder against a high oxygen gradient. The effect is also noted in the choroid rete, the network of blood vessels which carries oxygen to the retina. In the absence of the Root effect, retia will result in the diffusion of some oxygen directly from the arterial blood to the venous blood, making such systems less effective for the concentration of oxygen. It has also been hypothesized that the loss of affinity is used to provide more oxygen to red muscle during acidotic stress.
