= Sulfhemoglobinemia =

Medical condition

- Specialty: Hematology
- Symptoms: Cyanosis, urinary tract infection and chronic constipation
- Complications: Hypoxemia, methemoglobinemia, and hypoxia
- Duration: 100-120 days (lifespan of red blood cells)
- Causes: Sulfur medications such as phenacetin, metoclopramide, dapsone, phenzopyridine, and trimethoprim-sulfamethoxazole; hydrogen-sulfide-producing intestinal bacteria, such as Morganella morganii
- Risk factors: Pulmonary arteriovenous malformation
- Prevention: Avoidance of sulfur-containing compounds including drugs
- Treatment: Blood transfusions

Sulfhemoglobinemia, or sulphaemoglobinaemia, is a rare condition in which there is excess sulfhemoglobin (SulfHb) in the blood. The pigment is a greenish derivative of hemoglobin which cannot be converted back to normal, functional hemoglobin. It causes cyanosis even at low blood levels.

It is a rare blood condition in which the β-pyrrole ring of the hemoglobin molecule has the ability to bind irreversibly to any substance containing a sulfur atom. When hydrogen sulfide (H_{2}S) (or sulfide ions) and ferrous ions combine in the heme of hemoglobin, the blood is thus incapable of transporting oxygen to the tissues.

== Presentation ==
Symptoms include a blueish or greenish coloration of the blood (cyanosis), skin, and mucous membranes, even though a blood count test may not show any abnormalities in the blood. This discoloration is caused by greater than 5 grams per cent of deoxyhemoglobin, or 1.5 grams per cent of methemoglobin, or 0.5 grams per cent of sulfhemoglobin, all serious medical abnormalities.

== Causes ==
Sulfhemoglobinemia is usually drug induced, with drugs associated with it including sulfonamides, such as sulfasalazine or sumatriptan. Another possible cause is occupational exposure to sulfur compounds.

It can also be caused by phenazopyridine.

== Treatment ==
The condition generally resolves itself with erythrocyte (red blood cell) turnover, although blood transfusions can be necessary in extreme cases.
