= Blue Fugates =

American family known for blue skin

Fugates
- Country: United States
- Current region: Kentucky
- Founded: 1820
- Founder: Martin Fugate; Susan Williams
- Final head: Benjamin Stacy
- Members: Benjamin Stacy

The Fugates, commonly known as the "Blue Fugates" or the "Blue People of Kentucky", are an ancestral family living in the hills of Kentucky starting during the early 19th century, where they are known for having a genetic mutation in cytochrome b5 reductase that results in methemoglobinemia and a bluish skin color.

== Ancestry ==
Martin Fugate, a Frenchman, and Elizabeth Smith, who had married and settled near Hazard, Kentucky about 1820, were both carriers of the rare recessive methemoglobinemia (met-H) gene. As a result, four of their nine children exhibited blue skin. Their continued reproduction within the limited local gene pool along with a lack of transportation infrastructure ensured that many descendants of the Fugates were born with met-H.

The "bluest" of the blue Fugates, Luna Stacy, had 13 children and lived to age 77.

Descendants with the gene continued to live near Troublesome Creek and Ball Creek into the 20th century. They eventually came to the attention of the hematologist Madison Cawein III, who with the assistance of the nurse Ruth Pendergrass made a detailed study of their condition and ancestry. Based on a report published in the Journal of Clinical Investigation in 1960 by a public health physician named E. M. Scott, who had studied a similar phenomenon among native Alaskans, Cawein concluded that a deficiency of the enzyme diaphorase resulted in an oxygen deficiency in the red blood cells, causing the blood to appear brown, which in turn made the skin of those affected appear blue. He treated the family with methylene blue, which eased their symptoms and reduced the blue coloring of their skin. His findings were published in the Archives of Internal Medicine in 1964.

Benjamin Stacy, born in 1975, has been the last known descendant of the Fugates to have been born exhibiting the characteristic blue color of the disorder, though he soon lost his blue skin tone, exhibiting only blue tinges on his lips and fingertips when he became cold or agitated.

== See also ==
- Family aggregation
