= P50 (pressure) =

Chemistry term for pressure

In biochemistry, p_{50} represents the partial pressure of a gas required to achieve 50% saturation of a particular protein's binding sites. Values of p_{50} are negatively correlated with substrate affinity; lower values correspond to higher affinity and vice versa. The term is analogous to the Michaelis–Menten constant (K_{M}), which identifies the concentration of substrate required for an enzyme to achieve 50% of its maximum reaction velocity.

The concept of p_{50} is derived from considering the fractional saturation of a protein by a gas. Imagine myoglobin, a protein which is able to bind a single molecule of oxygen, as per the reversible reaction below, whose equilibrium constant K (which is also a dissociation constant, since it describes a reversible association-dissociation event) is equal to the product of the concentrations (at equilibrium) of free myoglobin and free oxygen, divided by the concentration of myoglobin-oxygen complex.

$$\ce{Mb + O_2 <=> Mb \cdot O_2}$$

$$\ce{\it{K}=\rm\frac{[Mb][O_2]}{[Mb\cdot O_2]}}$$

The fractional saturation Y_{O2} of the myoglobin is what proportion of the total myoglobin concentration is made up of oxygen-bound myoglobin, which can be rearranged as the concentration of free oxygen over the sum of that concentration and the dissociation constant K. Since diatomic oxygen is a gas, its concentration in solution can be thought of as a partial pressure.

$$Y_{O_2}=\rm\frac{[Mb\cdot O_2]}{[Mb]+[Mb\cdot O_2]}
\Rightarrow\rm\frac{[O_2]}{\it{K}\,\rm{+\,[O_2]}}
\Rightarrow\rm\frac{\it{p\rm{O_2}}}{\it{K}\,\rm{+\,\it{p\rm{O_2}}}}$$

From defining the p_{50} as the partial pressure at which the fractional saturation is 50%, we can deduce that it is in fact equal to the dissociation constant K.

$$\frac{p_{50}}{K+p_{50}}=0.5
\Rightarrow p_{50}=K$$

For example, myoglobin's p_{50} for O_{2} is 130 pascals while the P_{50} for adult hemoglobin is 3.5 kPa. Thus, when O_{2} partial pressure is low, hemoglobin-bound O_{2} is more readily transferred to myoglobin. Myoglobin, found in high concentrations in muscle tissue, can then transfer the oxygen to muscle tissue muscle fibers, where it will be used in the generation of energy to fuel muscle contraction. Another example is that of human fetal hemoglobin, which has a higher affinity (lower P_{50}) than adult hemoglobin, and therefore allows uptake of oxygen across the placental diffusion barrier.
