= Methemoglobinemia =

Condition of elevated methemoglobin in the blood

- Other names: Hemoglobin M disease,
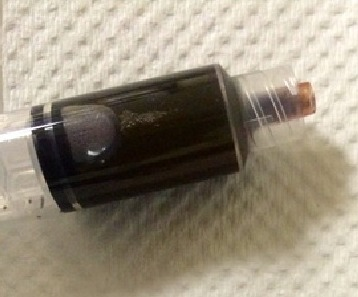
- Chocolate-brown blood due to methemoglobinemia
- Specialty: Toxicology, haematology, Emergency medicine
- Symptoms: Headache, dizziness, shortness of breath, nausea, poor muscle coordination, blue-colored skin
- Causes: Benzocaine, nitrites, dapsone, genetics
- Diagnostic method: Blood gas
- Differential diagnosis: Argyria, sulfhemoglobinemia, heart failure
- Treatment: Oxygen therapy, methylene blue
- Prognosis: Generally good with treatment
- Frequency: Relatively uncommon

Methemoglobinemia, or methaemoglobinaemia, is a condition of elevated methemoglobin in the blood. Symptoms may include headache, dizziness, shortness of breath, nausea, poor muscle coordination, and blue-colored skin (cyanosis). Complications may include seizures and heart arrhythmias.

Methemoglobinemia can be due to certain medications, chemicals, or food, or it can be inherited. Substances involved may include benzocaine, nitrites, or dapsone. The underlying mechanism involves some of the iron in hemoglobin being converted from the ferrous [Fe^{2+}] to the ferric [Fe^{3+}] form. The diagnosis is often suspected on the basis of symptoms and a low blood oxygen that does not improve with oxygen therapy. Diagnosis is confirmed by a blood gas analysis.

Treatment is generally with oxygen therapy and methylene blue. Other treatments may include vitamin C, exchange transfusion, and hyperbaric oxygen therapy. Outcomes are generally good with treatment. Methemoglobinemia is relatively uncommon, with most cases being acquired rather than genetic.

== Signs and symptoms ==
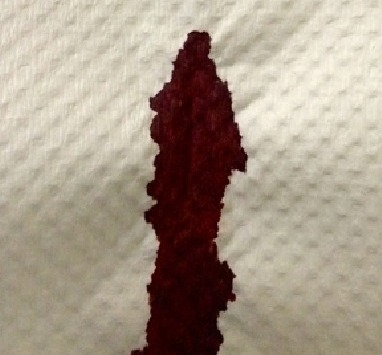
Chocolate-brown blood due to methemoglobinemia

Signs and symptoms of methemoglobinemia (methemoglobin level above 10%) include shortness of breath, cyanosis, mental status changes (~50%), headache, fatigue, exercise intolerance, dizziness, and loss of consciousness.

People with severe methemoglobinemia (methemoglobin level above 50%) may exhibit seizures, coma, and death (level above 70%). Healthy people may not have many symptoms with methemoglobin levels below 15%. However, people with co-morbidities such as anemia, cardiovascular disease, lung disease, sepsis, or who have abnormal hemoglobin species (e.g. carboxyhemoglobin, sulfhemoglobinemia or sickle hemoglobin) may experience moderate to severe symptoms at much lower levels (as low as 5–8%).

== Cause ==
=== Acquired ===
Methemoglobinemia may be acquired. Classical drug causes of methemoglobinemia include various antibiotics (trimethoprim, sulfonamides, and dapsone), local anesthetics (especially articaine, benzocaine, prilocaine, and lidocaine), and aniline dyes, metoclopramide, rasburicase, umbellulone, chlorates, bromates, and nitrites. Nitrates are suspected to cause methemoglobinemia.

In otherwise healthy individuals, the protective enzyme systems normally present in red blood cells rapidly reduce the methemoglobin back to hemoglobin and hence maintain methemoglobin levels at less than one percent of the total hemoglobin concentration. Exposure to exogenous oxidizing drugs and their metabolites (such as benzocaine, dapsone, and nitrates) may lead to an increase of up to a thousandfold of the methemoglobin formation rate, overwhelming the protective enzyme systems and acutely increasing methemoglobin levels.

Infants under six months of age have lower levels of a key methemoglobin reduction enzyme (NADH-cytochrome b5 reductase) in their red blood cells. This results in a major risk of methemoglobinemia caused by nitrates ingested in drinking water, dehydration (usually caused by gastroenteritis with diarrhea), sepsis, or topical anesthetics containing benzocaine or prilocaine resulting in blue baby syndrome. Nitrates used in agricultural fertilizers may leak into the ground and may contaminate well water. The current EPA standard of 10 ppm nitrate-nitrogen for drinking water is specifically set to protect infants. Benzocaine applied to the gums or throat (as commonly used in baby teething gels, or sore throat lozenges) can cause methemoglobinemia.

=== Genetic ===
The congenital form of methemoglobinemia has an autosomal recessive pattern of inheritance.

Due to a deficiency of the enzyme diaphorase I (cytochrome b5 reductase), methemoglobin levels rise and the blood of met-Hb patients has reduced oxygen-carrying capacity. Instead of being red in color, the arterial blood of met-Hb patients is brown. This results in the skin of white patients gaining a bluish hue. Hereditary met-Hb is caused by a recessive gene. If only one parent has this gene, offspring will have normal-hued skin, but if both parents carry the gene, there is a chance the offspring will have blue-hued skin.

Another cause of congenital methemoglobinemia is seen in patients with abnormal hemoglobin variants such as hemoglobin M (HbM), or hemoglobin H (HbH), which are not amenable to reduction despite intact enzyme systems.

Methemoglobinemia can also arise in patients with pyruvate kinase deficiency due to impaired production of NADH – the essential cofactor for diaphorase I. Similarly, patients with glucose-6-phosphate dehydrogenase deficiency may have impaired production of another co-factor, NADPH.

== Pathophysiology ==
The affinity for oxygen of ferric iron is impaired. The binding of oxygen to methemoglobin results in an increased affinity for oxygen in the remaining heme sites that are in ferrous state within the same tetrameric hemoglobin unit. This leads to an overall reduced ability of the red blood cell to release oxygen to tissues, with the associated oxygen–hemoglobin dissociation curve therefore shifted to the left. When methemoglobin concentration is elevated in red blood cells, tissue hypoxia may occur.

Normally, methemoglobin levels are <1%, as measured by the CO-oximetry test. Elevated levels of methemoglobin in the blood are caused when the mechanisms that defend against oxidative stress within the red blood cell are overwhelmed and the oxygen carrying ferrous ion (Fe^{2+}) of the heme group of the hemoglobin molecule is oxidized to the ferric state (Fe^{3+}). This converts hemoglobin to methemoglobin, resulting in a reduced ability to release oxygen to tissues and thereby hypoxia. This can give the blood a bluish or chocolate-brown color. Spontaneously formed methemoglobin is normally reduced (regenerating normal hemoglobin) by protective enzyme systems, e.g., NADH methemoglobin reductase (cytochrome-b5 reductase) (major pathway), NADPH methemoglobin reductase (minor pathway) and to a lesser extent the ascorbic acid and glutathione enzyme systems. Disruptions with these enzyme systems lead to methemoglobinemia. Hypoxia occurs due to the decreased oxygen-binding capacity of methemoglobin, as well as the increased oxygen-binding affinity of other subunits in the same hemoglobin molecule, which prevents them from releasing oxygen at normal tissue oxygen levels.

== Diagnosis ==
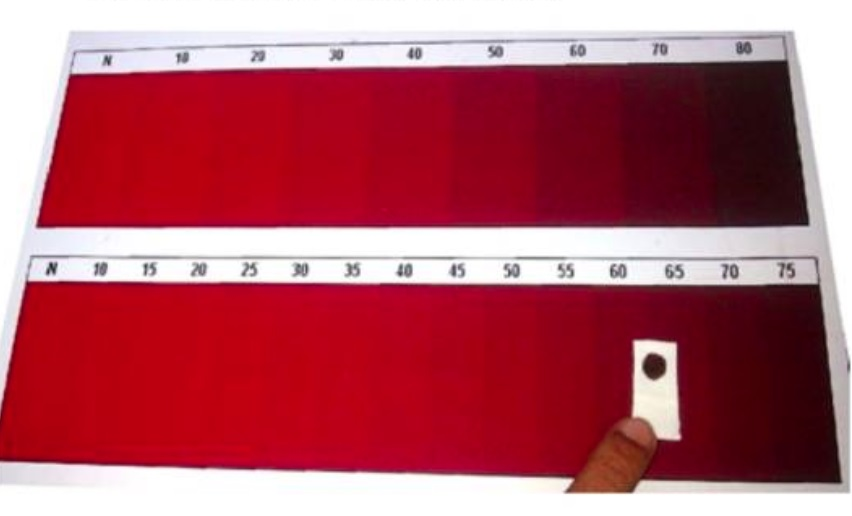
Color chart for the detection of the amount of methemoglobin in the blood

The diagnosis of methemoglobinemia is made with the typical symptoms, a suggestive history, low oxygen saturation on pulse oximetry measurements (SpO2) and these symptoms (cyanosis and hypoxia) failing to improve on oxygen treatment. The definitive test would be obtaining either CO-oximeter or a methemoglobin level on an arterial blood gas test. Arterial blood with an elevated methemoglobin level has a characteristic chocolate-brown color as compared to normal bright red oxygen-containing arterial blood; the color can be compared with reference charts.

The SaO2 calculation in the arterial blood gas analysis is falsely normal, as it is calculated under the premise of hemoglobin either being oxyhemoglobin or deoxyhemoglobin. However, co-oximetry can distinguish the methemoglobin concentration and percentage of hemoglobin. At the same time, the SpO2 concentration as measured by pulse ox is false high, because methemoglobin absorbs the pulse ox light at the 2 wavelengths it uses to calculate the ratio of oxyhemoglobin and deoxyhemoglobin. For example with a methemoglobin level of 30–35%, this ratio of light absorbance is 1.0, which translates into a false high SpO2 of 85%.

=== Differential diagnosis ===
Other conditions that can cause bluish skin include argyria, sulfhemoglobinemia, heart failure, amiodarone-induced bluish skin pigmentation and acrodermatitis enteropathica.

== Treatment ==
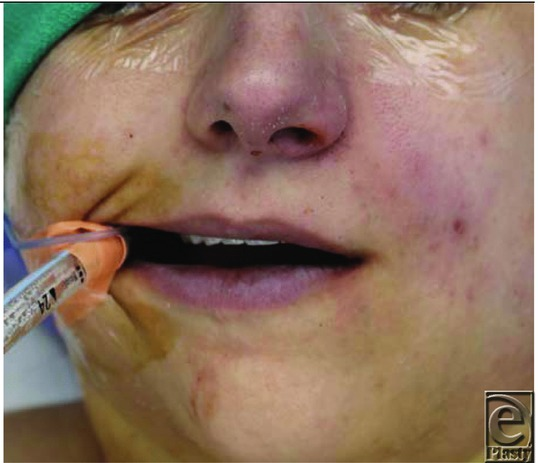
Cyanosis from methemoglobinemia

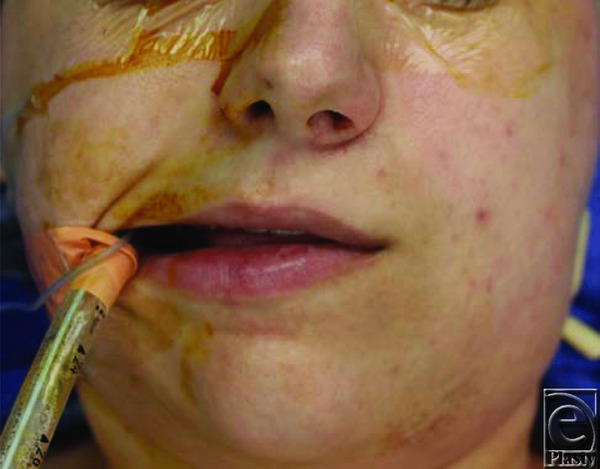
Resolved after methylene blue

Methemoglobinemia can be treated with supplemental oxygen and methylene blue. Methylene blue is given as a 1% solution (10 mg/ml) 1 to 2 mg/kg administered intravenously slowly over five minutes. Although the response is usually rapid, the dose may be repeated in one hour if the level of methemoglobin is still high one hour after the initial infusion. Methylene blue inhibits monoamine oxidase, and serotonin toxicity can occur if taken with an SSRI (selective serotonin reuptake inhibitor) medicine.

Methylene blue restores the iron in hemoglobin to its normal (reduced) oxygen-carrying state. This is achieved by providing an artificial electron acceptor (such as methylene blue or flavin) for NADPH methemoglobin reductase (RBCs usually don't have one; the presence of methylene blue allows the enzyme to function at 5× normal levels). The NADPH is generated via the hexose monophosphate shunt.

Genetically induced chronic low-level methemoglobinemia may be treated with oral methylene blue daily. Also, vitamin C can occasionally reduce cyanosis associated with chronic methemoglobinemia, and may be helpful in settings in which methylene blue is unavailable or contraindicated (e.g., in an individual with G6PD deficiency). Diaphorase (cytochrome b5 reductase) normally contributes only a small percentage of the red blood cell's reducing capacity, but can be pharmacologically activated by exogenous cofactors (such as methylene blue) to five times its normal level of activity.

== Epidemiology ==
Methemoglobinemia mostly affects infants under 6 months of age (particularly those under 4 months) due to low hepatic production of methemoglobin reductase. The most at-risk populations are those with water sources high in nitrates, such as wells and other water that is not monitored or treated by a water treatment facility. The nitrates can be hazardous to the infants. The link between blue baby syndrome in infants and high nitrate levels is well established for waters exceeding the normal limit of 10 mg/L. However, there is also evidence that breastfeeding is protective in exposed populations.

== Society and culture ==
=== Blue Fugates ===
The Fugates, a family that lived in the hills of Kentucky in the US, had the hereditary form. They are known as the "Blue Fugates". Martin Fugate and Elizabeth Smith, who had married and settled near Hazard, Kentucky, around 1800, were both carriers of the recessive methemoglobinemia (met-H) gene, as was a nearby clan with whom the Fugates descendants intermarried. As a result, many descendants of the Fugates were born with met-H.

=== Blue Men of Lurgan ===
The "blue men of Lurgan" were a pair of Lurgan men suffering from what was described as "familial idiopathic methemoglobinemia" who were treated by James Deeny in 1942. Deeny, who would later become the Chief Medical Officer of the Republic of Ireland, prescribed a course of ascorbic acid and sodium bicarbonate. In case one, by the eighth day of treatments, there was a marked change in appearance, and by the twelfth day of treatment, the patient's complexion was normal. In case two, the patient's complexion reached normality over a month-long duration of treatment.

== See also ==
- Carbon monoxide poisoning
- Hemoglobinemia
