= Carboxyhemoglobin =

Complex of carbon monoxide and hemoglobin

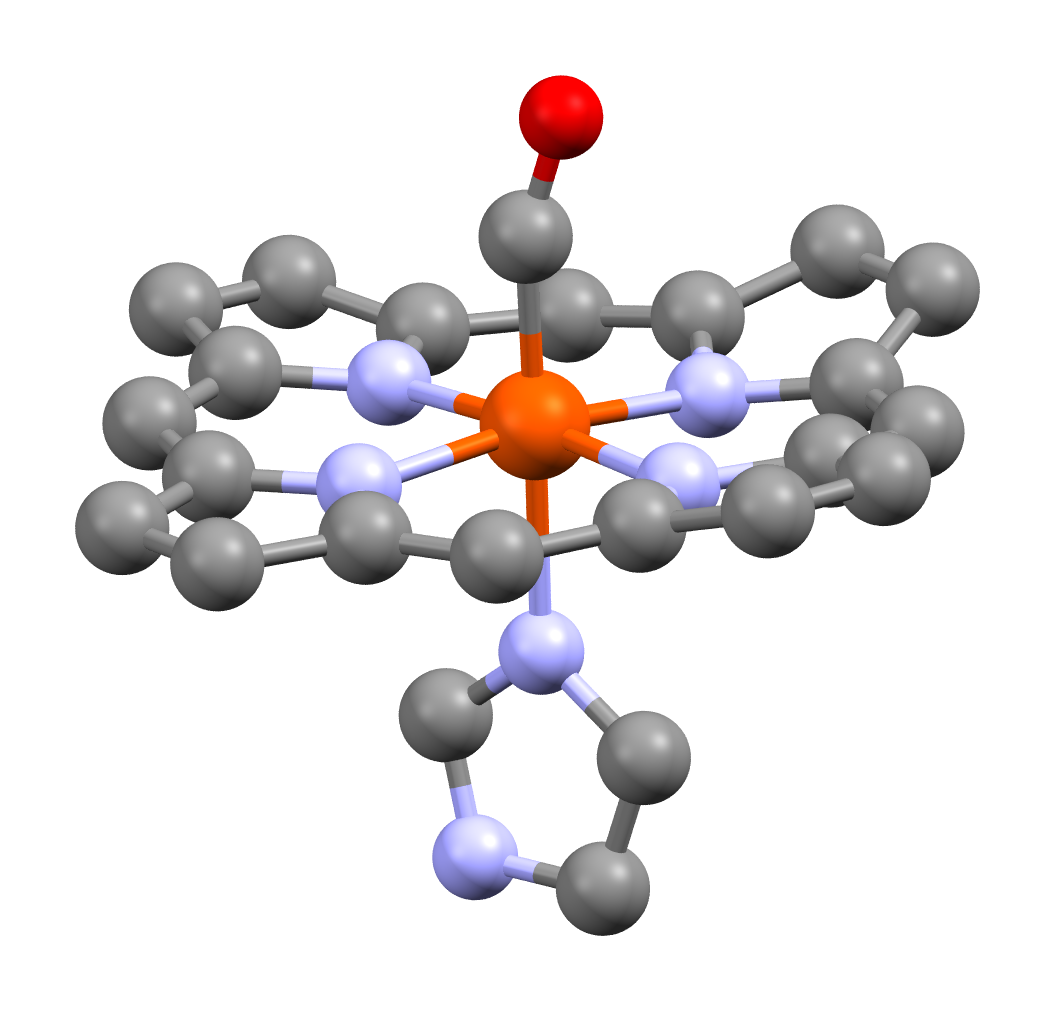
- A heme unit of human carboxyhaemoglobin, showing the carbonyl ligand at the apical position, trans to the histidine residue.

Names
- Preferred IUPAC name Carbonylhemoglobin
- Other names Carboxyhemoglobin; Carboxyhaemoglobin; Kohlenoxyhaemoglobin; Kohlenoxyhämoglobin; Kohlenoxydhämoglobin; Kohlenmonoxyhämoglobin; Carbonmonoxyhemoglobin; Carbon-monoxide-hemoglobin; Carbon-monoxide-Methemoglobin; Carbonic oxide hæmoglobin
- Except where otherwise noted, data are given for materials in their standard state (at 25 °C [77 °F], 100 kPa). Infobox references

Carboxyhemoglobin (carboxyhaemoglobin BrE) (symbol COHb or HbCO, also known as carbonylhemoglobin) is a stable complex of carbon monoxide and hemoglobin (Hb) that forms in red blood cells upon contact with carbon monoxide. Carboxyhemoglobin is often mistaken for the compound formed by the combination of carbon dioxide (carboxyl) and hemoglobin, which is actually carbaminohemoglobin. Carboxyhemoglobin terminology emerged when carbon monoxide was known by its historic name, "carbonic oxide", and evolved through Germanic and British English etymological influences; the preferred IUPAC nomenclature is carbonylhemoglobin.

The average non-smoker maintains a systemic carboxyhemoglobin level under 3% COHb whereas smokers approach 10% COHb. The biological threshold for carboxyhemoglobin tolerance is 15% COHb, meaning toxicity is consistently observed at levels in excess of this concentration. The FDA has previously set a threshold of 14% COHb in certain clinical trials evaluating the therapeutic potential of carbon monoxide.

== Overview ==
The average red blood cell contains 250 million hemoglobin molecules. Hemoglobin contains a globin protein unit with four prosthetic heme groups (hence the name heme -o- globin); each heme is capable of reversibly binding with one gaseous molecule (oxygen, carbon monoxide, cyanide, etc.), alternatively, hemoglobin can bind four CO_{2} molecules at terminal amines to form carbaminohemoglobin, therefore, in either case a typical red blood cell may carry up to one billion gas molecules (for unit comparison, the enzymatic velocity of carbonic anhydrase is estimated to catalyze bioconversion of CO_{2} to bicarbonate at a rate of ~10 million molecules per second). As the binding of carbon monoxide with a heme moiety of hemoglobin is reversible, certain models have estimated that 20% of the carbon monoxide carried as carboxyhemoglobin may dissociate in remote tissues.

== Endogenous carbon monoxide production ==
In biology, carbon monoxide is naturally produced through many enzymatic and non-enzymatic pathways. The most extensively studied pathway is the metabolism of heme by heme oxygenase which occurs throughout the body with significant activity in the spleen to facilitate hemoglobin breakdown during erythrocyte recycling. Therefore heme can both carry carbon monoxide in the case of carboxyhemoglobin, or, undergo enzymatic catabolism to generate carbon monoxide.

Carbon monoxide was characterized as a neurotransmitter in 1993 and has since been subcategorized as a gasotransmitter.

Most endogenously produced carbon monoxide is stored as carboxyhemoglobin. The gas primarily undergoes pulmonary excretion, however trace amounts may be oxidized to carbon dioxide by certain cytochromes, metabolized by resident microbiota, or excreted by transdermal diffusion.

== Affinity of hemoglobin for carbon monoxide ==
Compared to oxygen, carbon monoxide binds with approximately 240 times greater affinity, however the affinity of carbon monoxide for hemoglobin varies both across species and within a species. In the 1950s, Esther Killick was among the first to recognize a difference in carbon monoxide affinity between adult and foetal blood, and a difference between humans and sheep. In humans, the Hb-Kirklareli mutation has a relative 80,000 times greater affinity for carbon monoxide than oxygen resulting in systemic carboxyhemoglobin reaching a sustained level of 16% COHb. Other human mutations have been described (see Hemoglobin variants). Structural variations and mutations across other hemoproteins likewise affect carbon monoxide's interaction with the heme prosthetic group as exemplified by cytochrome P450 where certain forms of the CYP3A family is relatively less affected by the inhibitory effects of carbon monoxide.

Murinae species have a COHb half-life of 20 minutes compared to 300 minutes for a typical human (see § Toxicokinetics). As a result, the metabolic kinetics, blood saturation point, and tolerance for carbon monoxide exposure vary across species, potentially leading to data inconsistencies pertaining to the toxicology of carbon monoxide poisoning and pharmacology of low-dose therapeutic protocols.

Some deep-diving marine mammal species are known to contain concentrations of carbon monoxide in their blood that resembles levels seen in chronic cigarette smokers, which may provide benefits against hypoxia. Similarly, the elevated levels in smokers has been suggested to be a basis for the smoker's paradox. Prolonged exposure to carbon monoxide and elevated carboxyhemoglobin, such as in smoking, results in erythremia. Furthermore, humans can acclimate to toxic levels of carbon monoxide based on findings reported by Esther Killick.

== History ==
A bright red skin complexion is commonly associated with elevated carboxyhemoglobin levels. Trace evidence for an endogenous presence of carbon monoxide dates back to Marcellus Donato circa 1570 who noted an unusually red complexion upon conducting an autopsy of victims who died from charcoal fumes in Mantua. Similar findings pertaining to red complexion later emerged as documented by Johann Jakob Wepfer in the 1600s, and M. Antoine Portal in the late 1700s.

Phlogiston theory is a trace origin for the first chemical explanations of endogenous carboxyhemoglobin exemplified by the work of Joseph Priestley in the eighteenth century who suspected phlogiston to be a cellular waste product carried by the blood of animals which was subsequently exhaled.

Thomas Beddoes, James Watt, Humphry Davy, James Lind, and many others investigated the therapeutic potential of inhaling factitious airs in the late eighteenth century (see also: Pneumatic Institution). Among the gases experimented with, hydrocarbonate had received significant attention. Hydrocarbonate is water gas generated by passing steam over coke, the process of which generates carbon monoxide and hydrogen, and some considered it contained phlogiston. Beddoes and Watt recognized hydrocarbonate brightened venous blood in 1793. Watt suggested coal fumes could act as an antidote to the oxygen in blood, and Beddoes and Watt likewise speculated hydrocarbonate has a greater affinity for animal fiber than oxygen in 1796.

After the discovery of carbon monoxide by William Cruickshank in 1800, Johann Dömling (1803) and John Bostock (1804) developed hypotheses suggesting blood returned to the heart loaded with carbon monoxide to subsequently be oxidized to carbon dioxide in the lung prior to exhalation. Later in 1854, Adrien Chenot similarly suggested carbon monoxide could remove oxygen from blood and be oxidized within the body to carbon dioxide. The mechanism for carbon monoxide poisoning in the context of carboxyhemoglobin formation is widely credited to Claude Bernard whose memoirs beginning in 1846 and published in 1857 notably phrased, "prevents arterials blood from becoming venous". Felix Hoppe-Seyler independently published similar conclusions in the following year.

The first analytical method to detect carboxyhemoglobin emerged in 1858 with a colorimetric method developed by Felix Hoppe-Seyler, and the first quantitative analysis method emerged in 1880 with Josef von Fodor.

=== Etymology ===
Carbon is derived from the Latin term carbo, meaning coal, via the French charbone, which first appeared in print in 1786. The etymology of oxygen is generally accepted to mean 'acid' based on Lavoisier's system, which also recognized carbon as a nonmetallic element capable of oxidation, although the original degrees of oxides were based on diamond, graphite, coal and carbonic acid (CO_{2}) as the most oxidized form; the suffix -ic in carbonic is derived from Latin -icus and Greek -ikos meaning "pertaining to" or "having the nature of", which, when combined with the word acid as -ic acid, in Lavoisier's system the name carbonic acid is indicative of the maximum oxidation state of carbon (the max number of oxygen atoms attached to the nonmetallic carbon, whereas a nonmetal with the possibility of fewer oxygen atoms would subsequently be named -ous acid). Lavoisier's system was superseded by other obsolete oxide nomenclature systems.

Upon discovering carbon monoxide through a series of experiments originating from coke (short for coal-cake), Cruickshank named the new molecule "gaseous oxide of carbon" which evolved to "carbonic oxide" and was translated into German as "kohlenoxyd". Kohlen is the German word for coal (kohlenstoff is the word for the element carbon which emerged in the Lavoisier era), and oxyd is German for oxide, hence the literal translation is oxide of coal. As carbonic acid (CO_{2}) was considered to be the most highly oxidized form in Lavoisier's system, the name carbonic oxide implied an intermediate oxidized species between coal and carbonic acid (i.e. use of the word acid indicated maximum oxidation). Oxides were defined in 1804 to be "the compounds of oxygene not possessing acid properties." Therefore, the suffix -ic oxide in carbonic oxide could have the literal translation "carbon having the nature of an oxide". The term carbonous oxide appeared in some ancient texts as an attempt to bridge Lavoisier's nomenclature to the new molecule since the suffix -ic originally indicated two oxygen atoms in CO_{2} therefore the suffix -ous implies a lesser degree of oxidation with CO having one oxygen atom, but the name was scarcely used.

Haem is derived from Greek meaning blood. Regarding haem, after being translated from Hippocratic texts as haima, haem first appeared in ancient Roman texts and subsequently first appeared in English in the 1400s. The use of "ae / æ" remains prevalent in British English in modern day whereas the American English adopted the simplified Latinate spelling heme from hema. The exact origin of the heme spelling is unclear and may relate to a combination of factors such as: back-formation of heme as a scientific term derived from the established American English term hemoglobin, and in parallel, the novel Americanized root was heavily influenced by previously established terms such as hemorrhage (the first dictionary set of words with hem- prefix/root) which first appeared in Noah Webster's 1828 book An American Dictionary of the English Language during a period of time when American English actively abandoned British ligatures in the English-language spelling reform era. Anecdotal appearances of hæm- to hem-, such as hemoptysis from hæmoptysis, appeared as early as 1787. Due to "hem" visually appearing incomplete, the word may have been modified since English nouns often place a silent -e to the end of adopted terms for aesthetics along with French and scholarly spelling influences. Other benefits may include phonotactic signaling, disambiguation from hem, and lexical separation purposes. Standardization came later with the Simplified Spelling Board, Simplified Spelling Society, and other spelling reforms in English. Although it remains unclear, heme may have emerged in literature around 1900. As a result of the haem/heme divergence, COHb has more than one acceptable spelling.

Felix Hoppe-Seyler coined the name "hämoglobin" in 1864. In German, an umlaut such as ä is synonymous with spelling as "ae", therefore hämoglobin is commonly spelled as haemoglobin throughout German literature, hence haemoglobin was the term adopted by English literature. Globin is Latin derived from globus typically accepted to mean glob/spherical/round object, and the suffix -in indicates protein species. Haem/heme and globin are conjoined with an -o- since both heme and globin are scientific root words; -o- is acceptable for two scientific roots despite being in the presence of other vowels at the junction, however, in this specific case the stylistic vowel -e- is dropped from heme in American English whereas the alternative British English retained the classical Greek etymological double vowel, -ae- thereby retaining the consonant -m. Some sources suggest etymology of haemoglobin is simply a shortened version of hematoglobulin (mentioned as hämatoglobulin by Hoppe-Seyler in the 1864 publication). The term "hæmato-globulin" was coined by Jöns Jacob Berzelius and published in articles by scientists such as Henry Letheby as early as 1845 long before Hoppe-Seyler's molecular characterization at a time when cruor was regarded as a synonym due to scientists only having an empirical understanding of the molecule while pursuing early studies of thrombus.

Hoppe-Seyler likewise coined the name oxyhaemoglobin (the prefix oxy- implying addition of oxygen), as well as kohlenoxydhämoglobin which may have similarly been directly translated back into English as "carbonic oxide hæmoglobin". The term carboxyhæmoglobin appeared in the 1890s (the prefix carb- added to the existing word oxyhemoglobin to specify presence of both a carbon and oxygen species). The first appearance may have been in 1891 in Journal of the Chemical Society. An example of an early publication using carboxyhemoglobin appeared in 1895 in works by John Haldane while the name for CO was still widely regarded as carbonic oxide.

The term "carbon monoxide" was formally introduced by Henry Watts in 1879, but the name would not become mainstream for several decades. Variations of COHb terminology, such as Linus Pauling's usage of carbonmonoxyhemoglobin in the 1930s, followed and eventually evolved and simplified back into "carboxyhemoglobin" to likewise express a ligand containing both carbon and oxygen. In German, kohlenmonoxidhämoglobin (identical to Pauling's carbonmonoxyhemoglobin) currently remains a commonly used term alongside carboxyhämoglobin.

The modern chemistry language has redefined carboxy to encompass two functional groups (contraction of carbonyl + hydroxy) which is firmly associated with the R—CO_{2}^{—} carboxyl group and is named carbaminohemoglobin when the carboxyl groups attach to hemoglobin's terminal amines.

Carbon monoxide is generally regarded as a carbonyl, therefore IUPAC has recommended "carbonylhemoglobin" as the preferred COHb nomenclature. The name carbonyl consists of two parts: carbon- originating from the historical name carbonic acid (CO_{2}), and -yl from the Greek word hylē meaning 'the stuff from which a thing is made' (i.e. the carbonyl group appears within carbonic acid) although the substituent -yl now carries a different meaning present day. Despite the IUPAC guidance, carboxyhemoglobin remains the most widely used term as a trivial name akin to the survival of bicarbonate nomenclature.

== Analytical detection methods ==
Historically, carboxyhemoglobin detection has been achieved by colorimetric analysis, chemical reactivity, spectrophotometry, gasometric and thermoelectric detection methods. Gas chromatography analysis emerged in 1961 and remains a commonly used method.

Modern methods include pulse oximetry with a CO-oximeter, and a variety of other analytical techniques. Most methods require laboratory equipment, skilled technicians, or expensive electronics therefore rapid and economical detection technologies remain in development.

Breath carbon monoxide is another detection method that may correlate with carboxyhemoglobin levels.

== Carbon monoxide poisoning ==
Carbon monoxide poisoning, also known as carboxyhemoglobinemia, has plagued humankind since primitive ancestors first harnessed fire. In modern times, carboxyhemoglobin data assist physicians in making a poisoning diagnosis. However, carboxyhemoglobin levels do not necessarily correlate with the symptoms of carbon monoxide poisoning. In general, 30% COHb is considered severe carbon monoxide poisoning. The highest reported non-fatal carboxyhemoglobin level was 73% COHb.

=== Mode of toxic action ===
Gas exchange is an essential process for many organisms to maintain homeostasis. Oxygen accounts for about 20% of Earth's atmospheric air. While inhaling air is critical to supply cells with oxygen for aerobic respiration via the Bohr effect and Haldane effect (and perhaps local low oxygen partial pressure e.g. active muscles), exhaling the cellular waste product carbon dioxide is an equally critical aspect of respiration. Whereas the body can tolerate brief periods of hypoxia (as commonly occurs in anaerobic exercise, although the brain, heart, liver and kidney are significantly less tolerant than skeletal muscle), failure to expel carbon dioxide may cause respiratory acidosis (meaning bodily fluids and blood become too acidic thereby affecting homeostasis). In absence of oxygen, cells switch to anaerobic respiration which if prolonged may significantly increase lactic acid leading to metabolic acidosis.

In general, carbon monoxide is considered to displace and prevent oxygen from binding to heme thereby preventing delivery of oxygen throughout the body which induces hypoxia. To provide a simplified synopsis of the molecular mechanism of systemic gas exchange from an acid-base chemistry perspective, upon inhalation of air it is an accepted mechanism that oxygen binding to any of the heme sites triggers a conformational change in the protein unit of hemoglobin which then enables the binding of additional oxygen to each of the other heme sites. Upon arrival to the cellular region, oxygen is released at the tissue due to a conformational change in hemoglobin as caused in-part by ionization of hemoglobin's surface due to the "acidification" of the tissue's local pH (meaning a relatively higher concentration of 'acidic' protons / hydrogen ions annotated as H^{+}; an acidic pH is commonly referenced to as a low pH based on the acidity of pH 1-7 having a low number due to the inverse logarithmic calculations); the local acidity is caused by an increase in the biotransformation of carbon dioxide waste into carbonic acid via carbonic anhydrase. In other words, oxygenated arterial blood arrives to cells in the "hemoglobin R-state" which has deprotonated/unionized amino acid residues (regarding hemoglobin's amines transitioning between the deprotonated/unionized Hb-NH_{2} to the protonated/ionized Hb-NH_{3}^{+} state) based on the less-acidic pH (arterial blood averages pH 7.407 whereas venous blood is slightly more acidic at pH 7.371). The "T-state" of hemoglobin is deoxygenated in venous blood partially due to protonation/ionization as caused by the acidic environment hence causing a conformation unsuited for oxygen-binding (i.e. in a theatric example, oxygen is 'ejected' into dissolution upon arrival at the cell due to H^{+} ions bombarding the hemoglobin surface residues to convert Hb from "R-state" to "T-state", and equilibria dynamics drives the spatial diffusion and distribution throughout the tissue region). Furthermore, the mechanism for formation of carbaminohemoglobin generates additional H^{+} ions that may further stabilize the protonated/ionized deoxygenated hemoglobin. Upon return of venous blood into the lung and subsequent exhalation of carbon dioxide, the blood is "de-acidified" (see also: hyperventilation) for the deprotonation/unionization of hemoglobin to re-enable oxygen binding as part of the transition to arterial blood (note this process is complex due to involvement of chemoreceptors, pH buffers, pO_{2} equilibria and many other physiochemical functionalities). Carbon monoxide poisoning disturbs this physiological process hence the venous blood of poisoning patients is bright red akin to arterial blood since the carbonyl/carbon monoxide is retained, whereas deoxygenated hemoglobin is dark red and carbaminohemoglobin has a blue hue.

At toxic concentrations, carbon monoxide as carboxyhemoglobin significantly interferes with respiration and gas exchange by simultaneously inhibiting acquisition and delivery of oxygen to cells, and preventing formation of carbaminohemoglobin which accounts for approximately 10% - 30% of carbon dioxide exportation. Therefore a patient suffering from carbon monoxide poisoning may experience severe hypoxia and acidosis in addition to the toxicities of excess carbon monoxide binding to numerous hemoproteins, metallic and non-metallic targets which affect cellular machinery (such as inhibition of cytochrome c oxidase).

=== Toxicokinetics ===
In common air under normal atmospheric conditions, a typical patient's carboxyhemoglobin has a half-life around 300 minutes. This time can be reduced to 90 minutes upon administration of high-flow pure oxygen, and the time is further reduced when oxygen is administered with 5% carbon dioxide as first identified by Esther Killick. Additionally, treatment in a hyperbaric chamber is a more effective manner of reducing the half-life of carboxyhemoglobin to 30 minutes and allows oxygen to dissolve in biological fluids for delivery to tissues.

Supplemental oxygen takes advantage of Le Chatelier's principle to quicken the decomposition of carboxyhemoglobin back to hemoglobin:

HbCO + O_{2} ⇌ Hb + CO + O_{2} ⇌ HbO_{2} + CO

== Carboxyhemoglobin pharmaceuticals ==
As carbon monoxide is now understood to have a therapeutic potential, pharmaceutical efforts have focused on development of carbon monoxide-releasing molecules and selective heme oxygenase inducers.

An alternative method for drug delivery consists of carbon monoxide immobilized on polyethylene glycol (PEG)-lyated bovine carboxyhemoglobin which is currently in late clinical development. Similarly, maleimide PEG conjugated human carboxyhemoglobin had previously been the subject of pharmaceutical development.

== See also ==
- Carbaminohemoglobin (Hb associated with CO_{2})
- Hemoglobinometer
- Hemoprotein
- Methemoglobin (ferric Hb, or ferrihemoglobin)
- Oxyhemoglobin (with diatomic oxygen, colored blood-red)
