= Blood =

Body fluid in the circulatory system

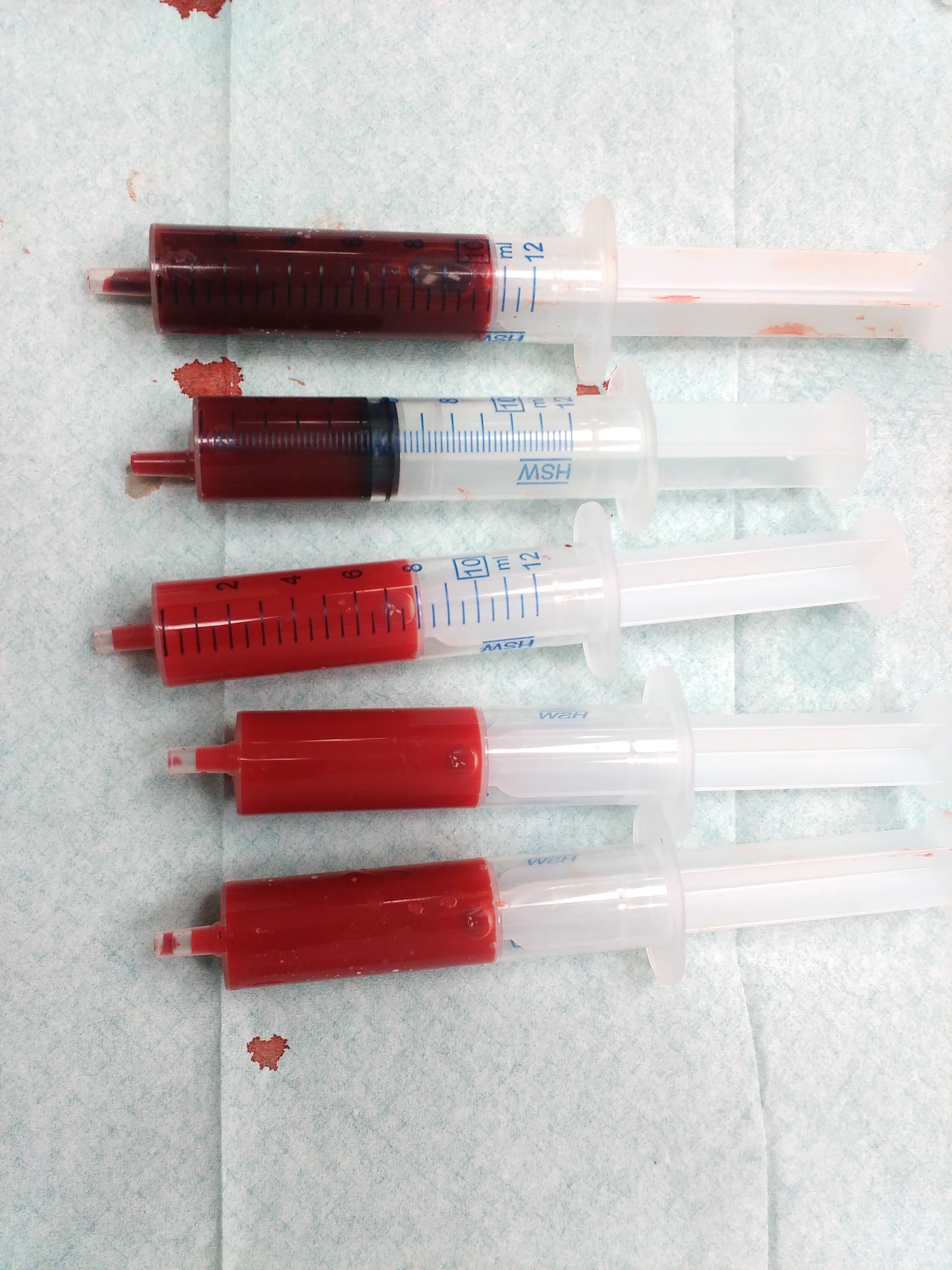
- Venous (darker) and arterial (brighter) blood in syringes.

Details

Identifiers
- Latin: sanguis
- Greek: αἷμα (haîma)
- MeSH: D001769
- TA98: A12.0.00.009
- TA2: 3892
- FMA: 9670

Blood is a specialized form of connective tissue and body fluid in the circulatory system of humans and other vertebrates that delivers necessary substances such as nutrients and oxygen to the cells of the body, and transports metabolic waste products away from those same cells.

Blood is composed of blood cells suspended in plasma. Plasma, which constitutes 55% of blood fluid, is mostly water (92% by volume), and contains proteins, glucose, mineral ions, and hormones. The blood cells are mainly red blood cells (erythrocytes), white blood cells (leukocytes), and (in mammals) platelets (thrombocytes). The most abundant cells are red blood cells. These contain hemoglobin, which facilitates oxygen transport by reversibly binding to it, increasing its solubility. Jawed vertebrates have an adaptive immune system, based largely on white blood cells. White blood cells help to resist infections and parasites. Platelets are important in the clotting of blood.

Blood is circulated around the body through blood vessels by the pumping action of the heart. In animals with lungs, arterial blood carries oxygen from inhaled air to the tissues of the body, and venous blood carries carbon dioxide, a waste product of metabolism produced by cells, from the tissues to the lungs to be exhaled. Blood is bright red when its hemoglobin is oxygenated and dark red when it is deoxygenated.

Medical terms related to blood often begin with hemo-, hemato-, haemo- or haemato- from the Greek word αἷμα (haima) for "blood". In terms of anatomy and histology, blood is considered a specialized form of connective tissue, given its composition of cells and cell fragments suspended in plasma.

== Functions ==
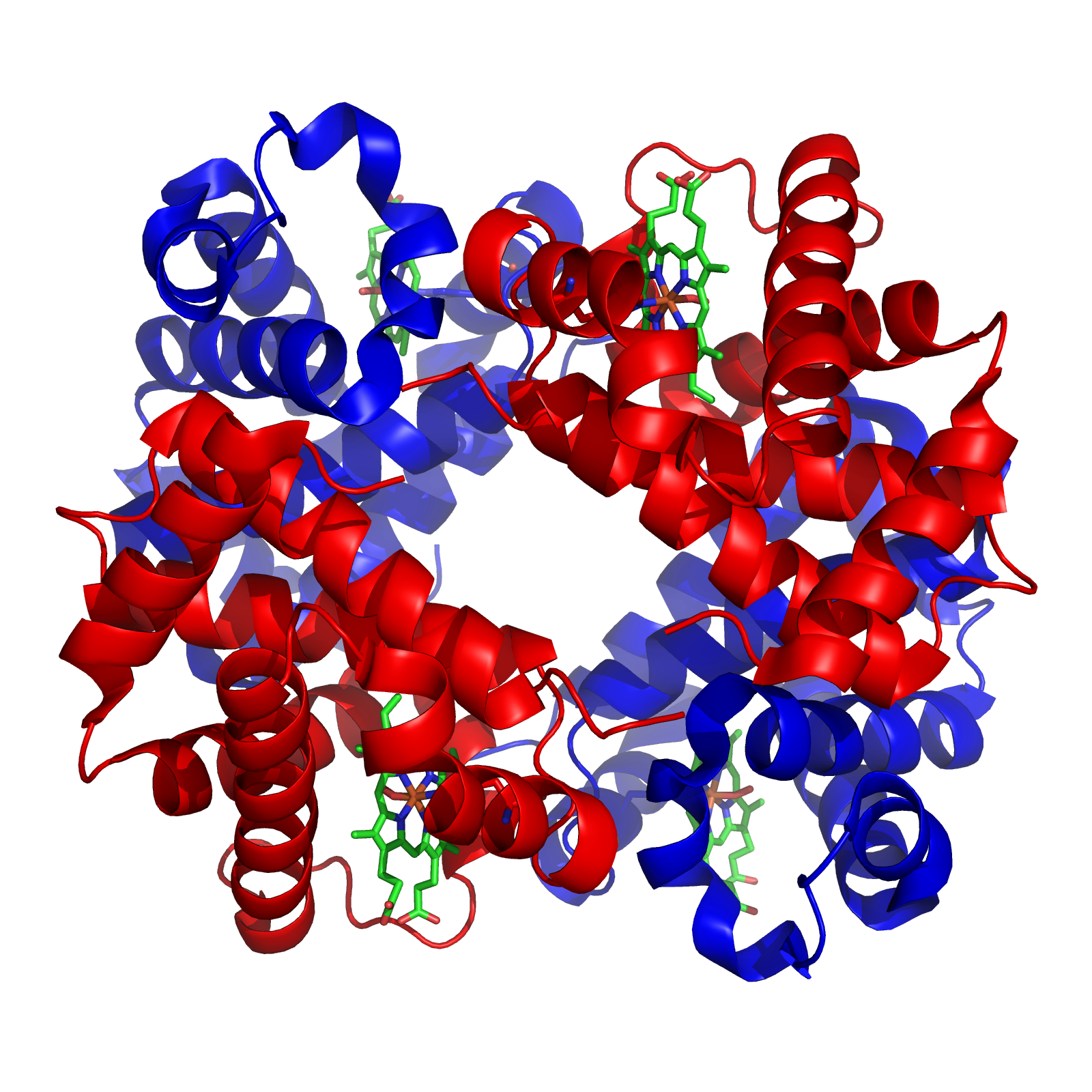
Hemoglobin, a globular protein green = haem (or heme) groups red & blue = protein subunits

Blood performs many important functions within the body, including:

- Supply of oxygen to tissues (bound to hemoglobin, which is carried in red cells)
- Supply of nutrients such as glucose, amino acids, and fatty acids (dissolved in the blood or bound to plasma proteins (e.g., blood lipids))
- Removal of waste such as carbon dioxide, urea, and lactic acid
- Immunological functions, including circulation of white blood cells, and detection of foreign material by antibodies
- Coagulation, the response to a broken blood vessel, the conversion of blood from a liquid to a semisolid gel to stop bleeding
- Messenger functions, including the transport of hormones and the signaling of tissue damage
- Regulation of core body temperature
- Hydraulic functions

== Constituents ==
=== In mammals ===
Blood accounts for 7% of the human body weight, with an average density around 1060 kg/m^{3}, very close to pure water's density of 1000 kg/m^{3}. The average adult has a blood volume of roughly 5 litres (11 US pt) or 1.3 gallons, which is composed of plasma and formed elements. The formed elements are the two types of blood cell or corpuscle – the red blood cells, (erythrocytes) and white blood cells (leukocytes) – and the cell fragments called platelets that are involved in clotting. By volume, the red blood cells constitute about 45% of whole blood, the plasma about 54.3%, and white cells about 0.7%.

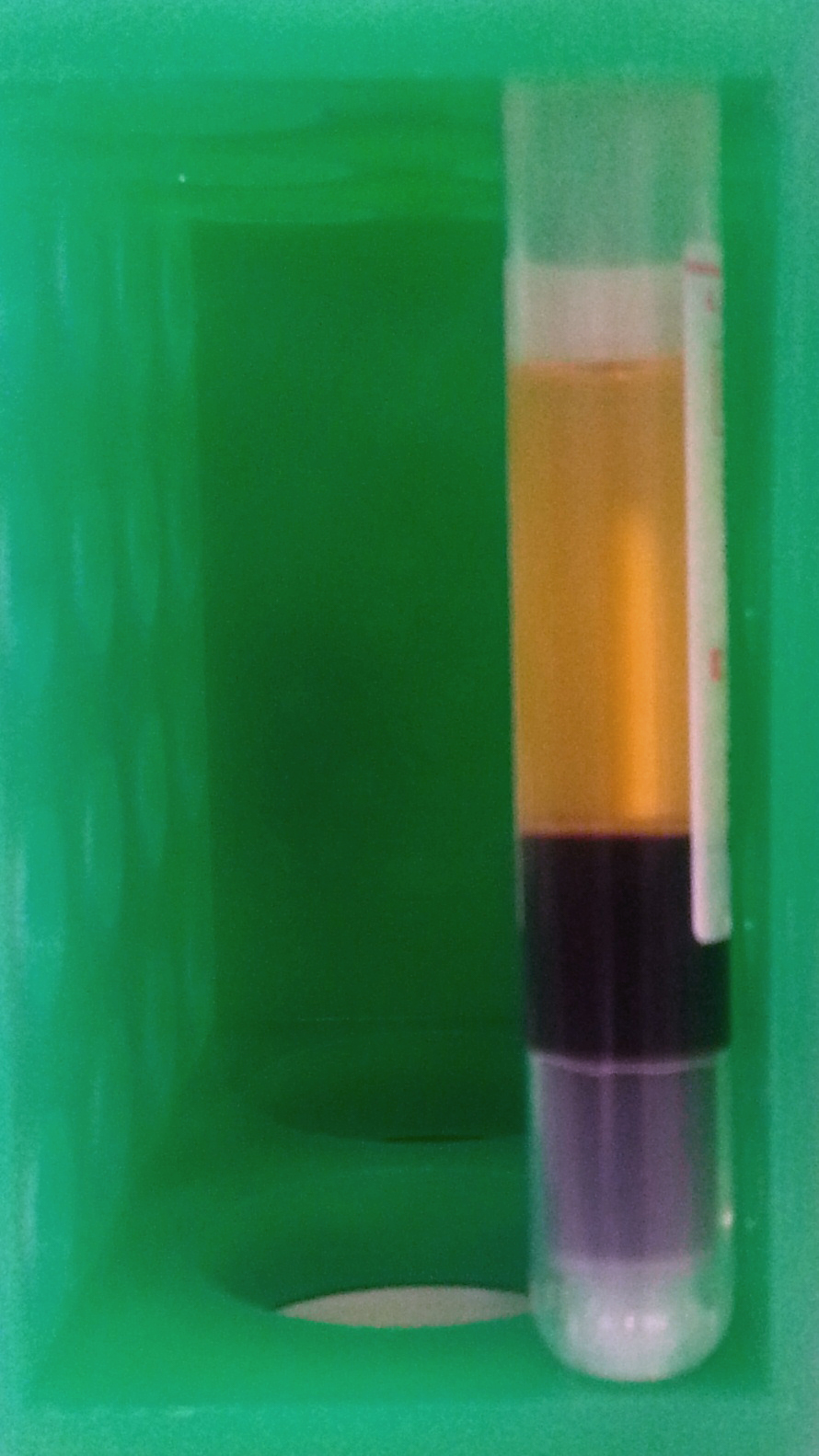
Human blood fractioned by centrifugation: Plasma (upper, yellow layer), buffy coat (middle, thin white layer) and erythrocyte layer (bottom, red layer) can be seen.

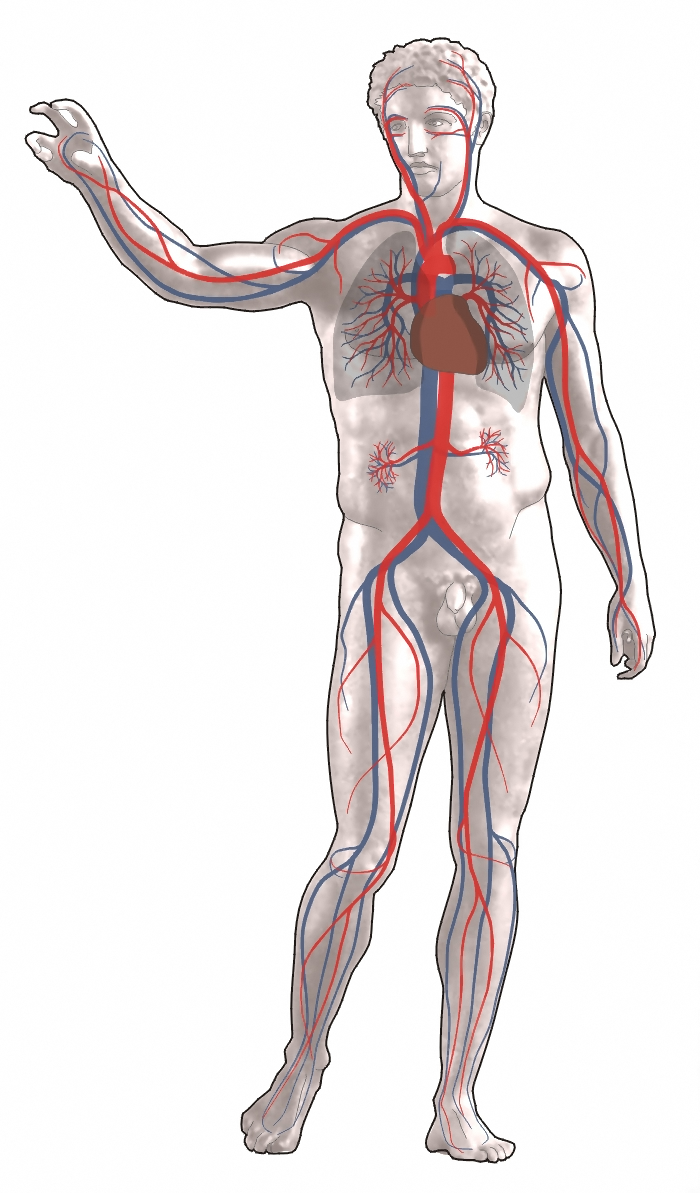
Blood circulation: Red = oxygenated, blue = deoxygenated

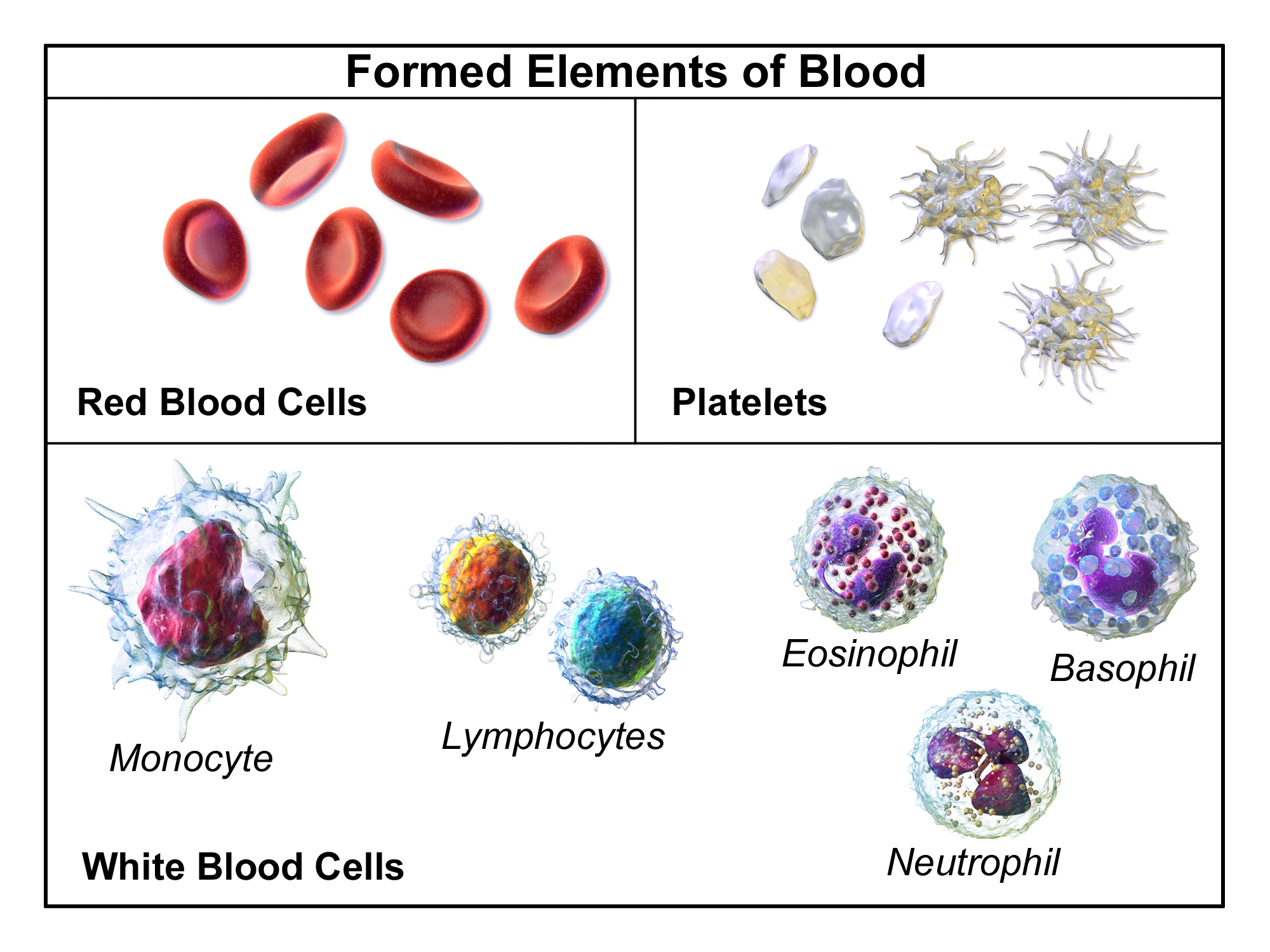
Illustration depicting formed elements of blood

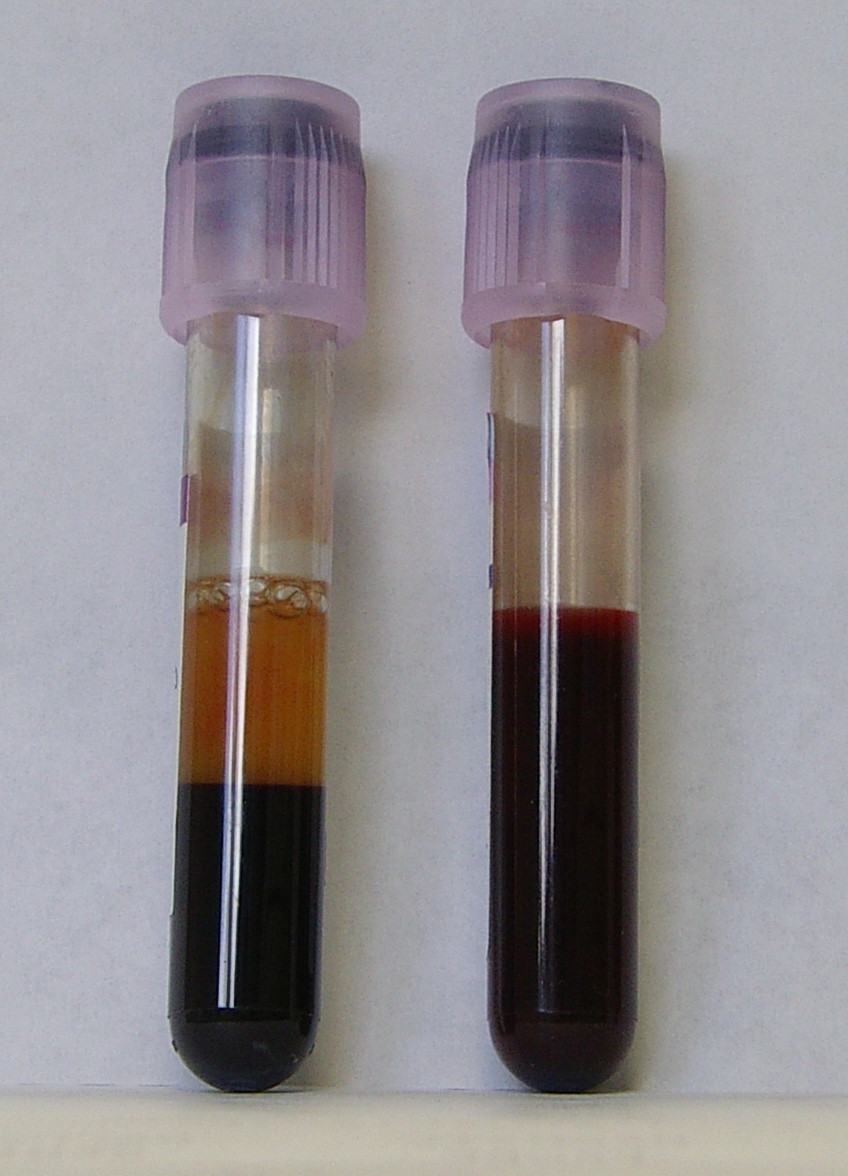
Two tubes of EDTA-anticoagulated blood.
Left tube: after standing, the RBCs have settled at the bottom of the tube.
Right tube: Freshly drawn blood

==== Cells ====
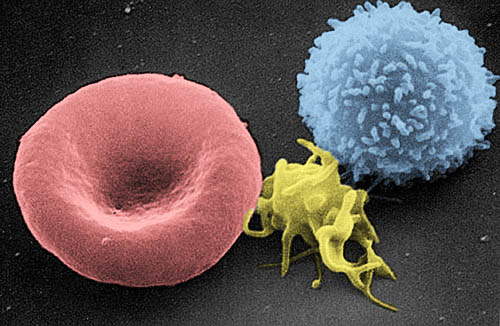
A scanning electron microscope (SEM) image of a normal red blood cell (left), a platelet (middle), and a white blood cell (right)

One microliter of blood contains:

- 4.7 to 6.1 million (male), 4.2 to 5.4 million (female) erythrocytes: Red blood cells contain the blood's hemoglobin and distribute oxygen. Mature red blood cells lack a nucleus and organelles in mammals. The red blood cells (together with endothelial vessel cells and other cells) are also marked by glycoproteins that define the different blood types. The proportion of blood occupied by red blood cells is referred to as the hematocrit, and is normally about 45%. The combined surface area of all red blood cells of the human body would be roughly 2,000 times as great as the body's exterior surface.
- 4,000–11,000 leukocytes: White blood cells are part of the body's immune system; they destroy and remove old or aberrant cells and cellular debris, as well as attack infectious agents (pathogens) and foreign substances. The cancer of leukocytes is called leukemia.
- 200,000–500,000 thrombocytes: Also called platelets, they take part in blood clotting (coagulation). Fibrin from the coagulation cascade creates a mesh over the platelet plug.

Constitution of normal blood
Parameter	Value	Refs.
Hematocrit	45 ± 7 (38–52%) for males 42 ± 5 (37–47%) for females	
pH	7.35–7.45	
base excess	−3 to +3	
PO_{2}	10–13 kPa (80–100 mm Hg)	
PCO_{2}	4.8–5.8 kPa (35–45 mm Hg)	
HCO_{3}^{−}	21–27 mM	
Oxygen saturation	Oxygenated: 98–99% Deoxygenated: 75%	

==== Plasma ====
About 55% of blood is blood plasma, a fluid that is the blood's liquid medium, which by itself is straw-yellow in color. The total blood plasma volume in an average human is 2.7–3.0 liters (2.8–3.2 quarts). It is essentially an aqueous solution containing 92% water, 8% blood plasma proteins, and trace amounts of other materials. Plasma circulates dissolved nutrients, such as glucose, amino acids, and fatty acids (dissolved in the blood or bound to plasma proteins), and removes waste products, such as carbon dioxide, urea, and lactic acid.

Other important components include:

- Serum albumin
- Blood-clotting factors (to facilitate coagulation)
- Immunoglobulins (antibodies)
- lipoprotein particles
- Various other proteins
- Various electrolytes (mainly sodium and chloride)

The term serum refers to plasma from which the clotting proteins have been removed. Most of the proteins remaining are albumin and immunoglobulins.

==== Acidity ====
Blood pH is regulated to stay within the narrow range of 7.35 to 7.45, making it slightly basic (compensation). Extra-cellular fluid in blood that has a pH below 7.35 is too acidic, whereas blood pH above 7.45 is too basic. A pH below 6.9 or above 7.8 is usually lethal. Blood pH, partial pressure of oxygen (pO_{2}), partial pressure of carbon dioxide (pCO_{2}), and bicarbonate (HCO_{3}^{−}) are carefully regulated by a number of homeostatic mechanisms, which exert their influence principally through the respiratory system and the urinary system to control the acid–base balance and respiration, which is called compensation. An arterial blood gas test measures these. Plasma also circulates hormones transmitting their messages to various tissues. The list of normal reference ranges for various blood electrolytes is extensive.

=== In non-mammals ===
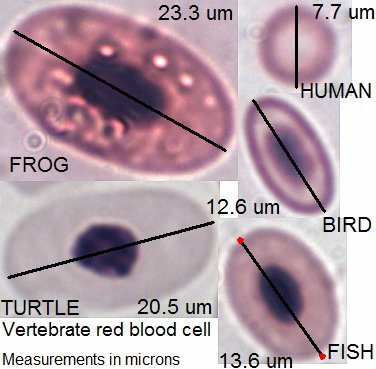
Vertebrate red blood cell types, measurements in micrometers

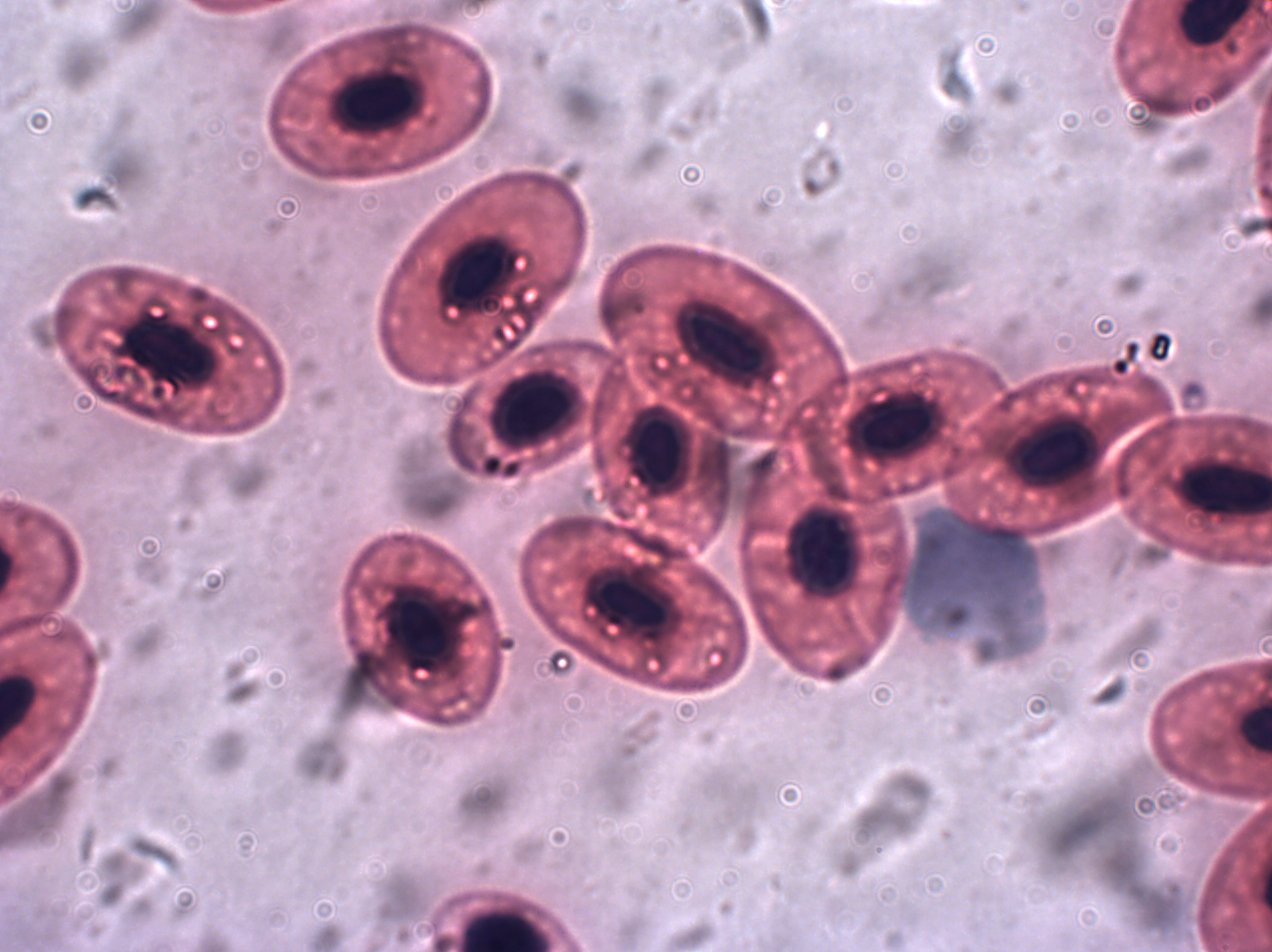
Frog red blood cells magnified 1000 times

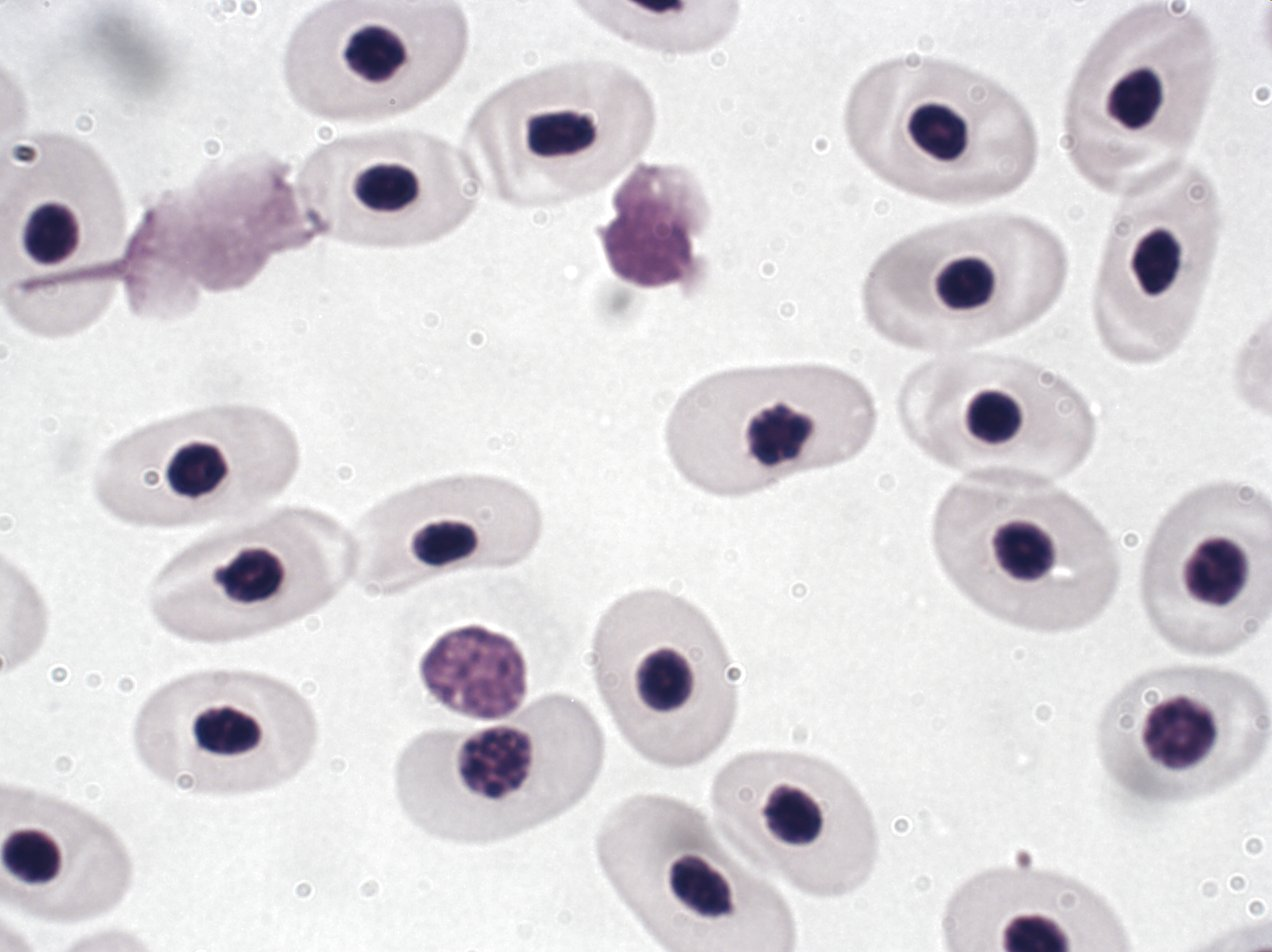
Turtle red blood cells magnified 1000 times

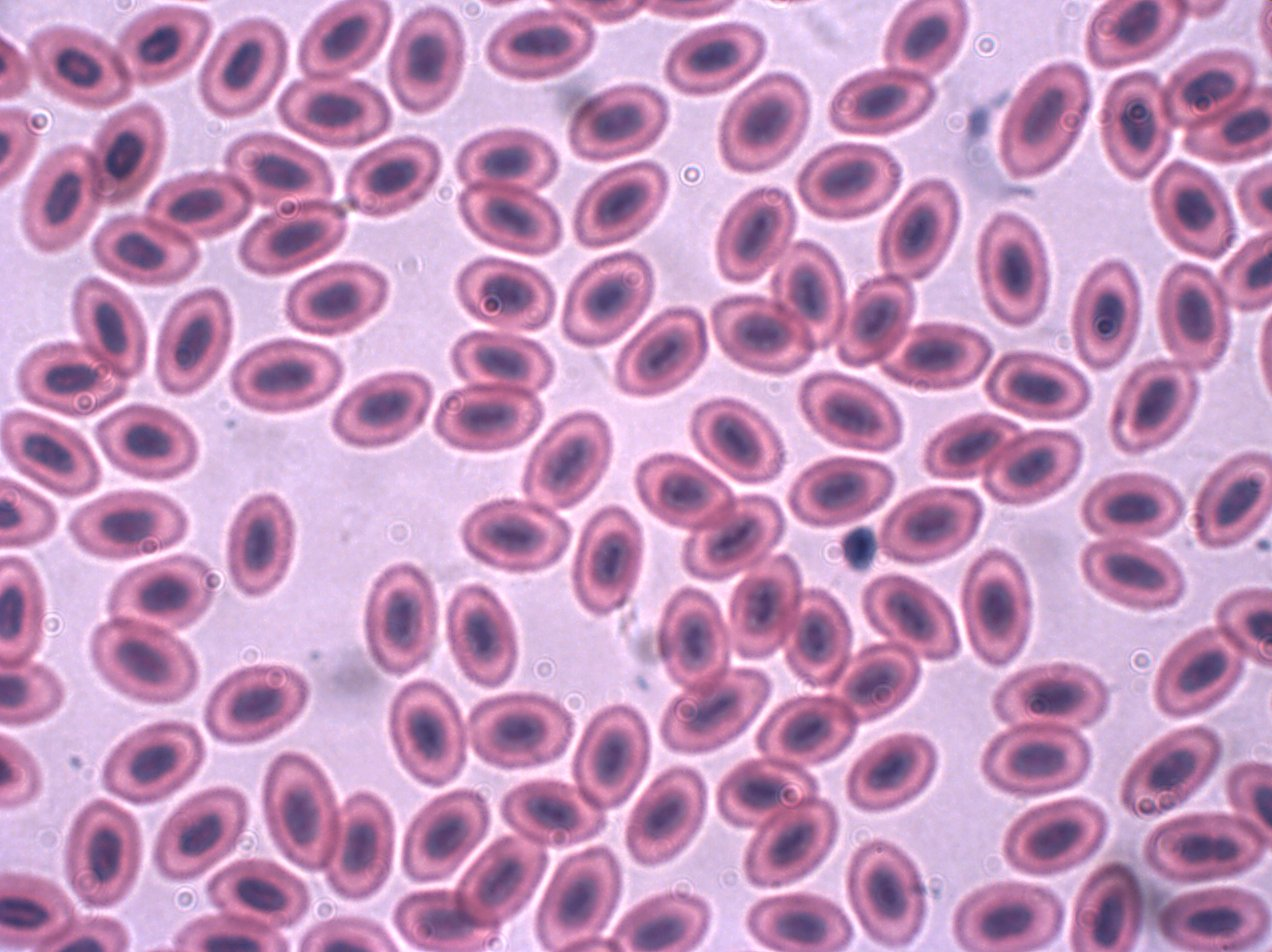
Chicken red blood cells magnified 1000 times

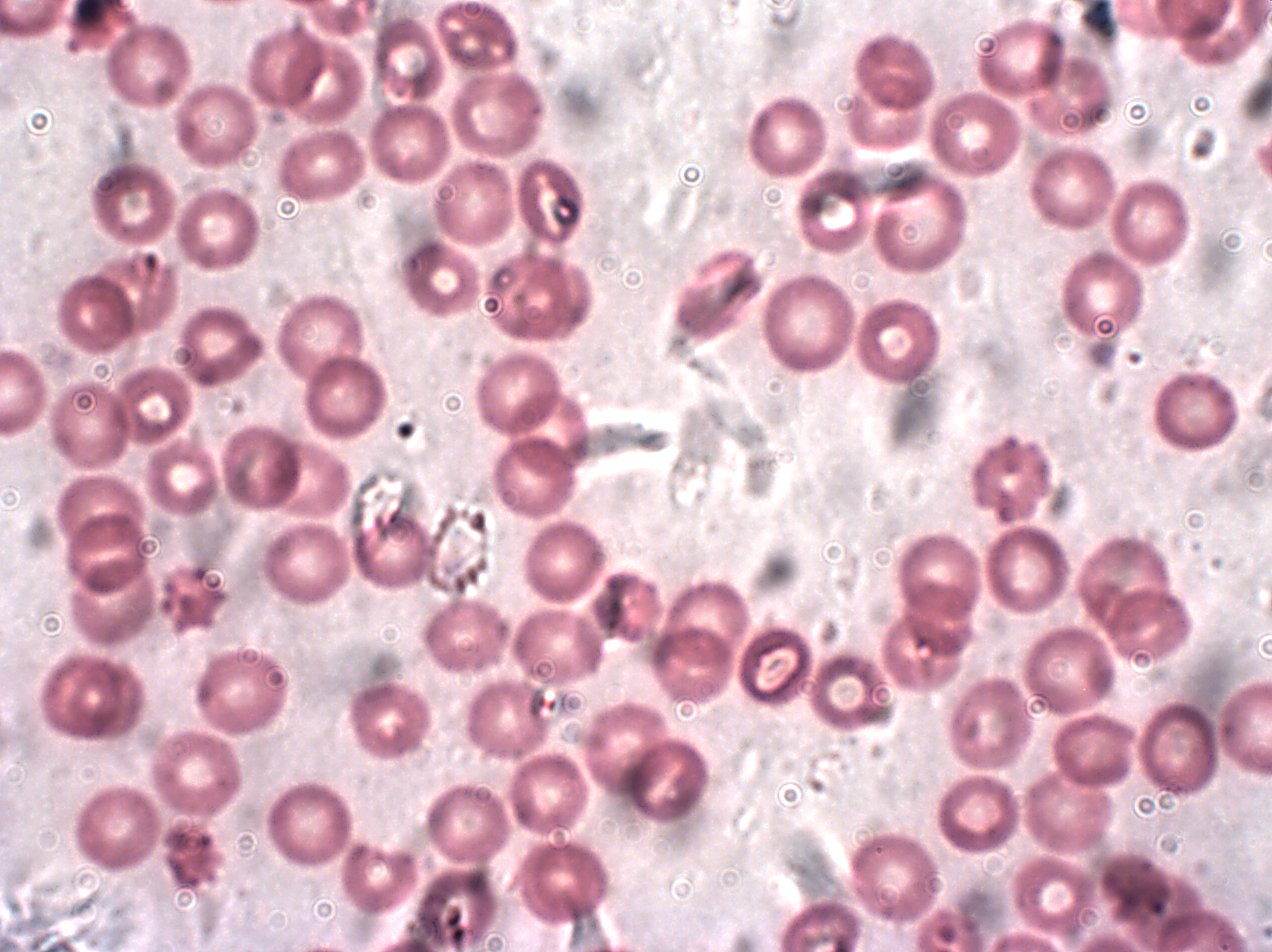
Human red blood cells magnified 1000 times

Human blood is typical of that of mammals, although the precise details concerning cell numbers, size, protein structure, and so on, vary somewhat between species. In non-mammalian vertebrates, however, there are some key differences:

- Red blood cells of non-mammalian vertebrates are flattened and ovoid in form, and retain their cell nuclei.
- There is considerable variation in the types and proportions of white blood cells; for example, acidophils are generally more common than in humans.
- Platelets are unique to mammals; in other vertebrates, small nucleated, spindle cells called thrombocytes are responsible for blood clotting instead.

== Physiology ==
=== Circulatory system ===
Circulation of blood through the human heart

Blood is circulated around the body through blood vessels by the pumping action of the heart. In humans, blood is pumped from the strong left ventricle of the heart through arteries to peripheral tissues and returns to the right atrium of the heart through veins. It then enters the right ventricle and is pumped through the pulmonary artery to the lungs and returns to the left atrium through the pulmonary veins. Blood then enters the left ventricle to be circulated again. Arterial blood carries oxygen from inhaled air to all of the cells of the body, and venous blood carries carbon dioxide, a waste product of metabolism by cells, to the lungs to be exhaled. However, one exception includes pulmonary arteries, which contain the most deoxygenated blood in the body, while the pulmonary veins contain oxygenated blood.

Additional return flow may be generated by the movement of skeletal muscles, which can compress veins and push blood through the valves in veins toward the right atrium.

The blood circulation was described by William Harvey in 1628.

=== Cell production and degradation ===
In vertebrates, the various cells of blood are made in the bone marrow in a process called hematopoiesis, which includes erythropoiesis, the production of red blood cells; and myelopoiesis, the production of white blood cells and platelets. During childhood, almost every human bone produces red blood cells; as adults, red blood cell production is limited to the larger bones: the bodies of the vertebrae, the breastbone (sternum), the ribcage, the pelvic bones, and the bones of the upper arms and legs. In addition, during childhood, the thymus gland, found in the mediastinum, is an important source of T lymphocytes. The proteinaceous component of blood (including clotting proteins) is produced predominantly by the liver, while hormones are produced by the endocrine glands and the watery fraction is regulated by the hypothalamus and maintained by the kidney.

Healthy erythrocytes have a plasma life of about 120 days before they are degraded by the spleen, and the Kupffer cells in the liver. The liver also clears some proteins, lipids, and amino acids. The kidney actively secretes waste products into the urine.

=== Oxygen transport ===
Basic hemoglobin saturation curve. It is moved to the right in higher acidity (more dissolved carbon dioxide) and to the left in lower acidity (less dissolved carbon dioxide)

About 98.5% of the oxygen in a sample of arterial blood in a healthy human breathing air at sea-level pressure is chemically combined with the hemoglobin. About 1.5% is physically dissolved in the other blood liquids and not connected to hemoglobin. The hemoglobin molecule is the primary transporter of oxygen in mammals and many other species. Hemoglobin has an oxygen binding capacity between 1.36 and 1.40 ml O_{2} per gram hemoglobin, which increases the total blood oxygen capacity seventyfold, compared to if oxygen solely were carried by its solubility of 0.03 ml O_{2} per liter blood per mm Hg partial pressure of oxygen (about 100 mm Hg in arteries).

With the exception of pulmonary and umbilical arteries and their corresponding veins, arteries carry oxygenated blood away from the heart and deliver it to the body via arterioles and capillaries, where the oxygen is consumed; afterwards, venules and veins carry deoxygenated blood back to the heart.

Under normal conditions in adult humans at rest, hemoglobin in blood leaving the lungs is about 98–99% saturated with oxygen, achieving an oxygen delivery between 950 and 1150 ml/min to the body. In a healthy adult at rest, oxygen consumption is approximately 200–250 ml/min, and deoxygenated blood returning to the lungs is still roughly 75% (70 to 78%) saturated. Increased oxygen consumption during sustained exercise reduces the oxygen saturation of venous blood, which can reach less than 15% in a trained athlete; although breathing rate and blood flow increase to compensate, oxygen saturation in arterial blood can drop to 95% or less under these conditions. Oxygen saturation this low is considered dangerous in an individual at rest (for instance, during surgery under anesthesia). Sustained hypoxia (oxygenation less than 90%), is dangerous to health, and severe hypoxia (saturations less than 30%) may be rapidly fatal.

A fetus, receiving oxygen via the placenta, is exposed to much lower oxygen pressures (about 21% of the level found in an adult's lungs), so fetuses produce another form of hemoglobin with a much higher affinity for oxygen (hemoglobin F) to function under these conditions.

=== Carbon dioxide transport ===
CO_{2} is carried in blood in three different ways. (The exact percentages vary depending whether it is arterial or venous blood). Most of it (about 70%) is converted to bicarbonate ions HCO^{−}_{3} by the enzyme carbonic anhydrase in the red blood cells by the reaction CO_{2} + H_{2}O → H_{2}CO_{3} → H^{+} + HCO^{−}_{3}; about 7% is dissolved in the plasma; and about 23% is bound to hemoglobin as carbamino compounds.

Hemoglobin, the main oxygen-carrying molecule in red blood cells, carries both oxygen and carbon dioxide. However, the CO_{2} bound to hemoglobin does not bind to the same site as oxygen. Instead, it combines with the N-terminal groups on the four globin chains. However, because of allosteric effects on the hemoglobin molecule, the binding of CO_{2} decreases the amount of oxygen that is bound for a given partial pressure of oxygen. The decreased binding to carbon dioxide in the blood due to increased oxygen levels is known as the Haldane effect, and is important in the transport of carbon dioxide from the tissues to the lungs. A rise in the partial pressure of CO_{2} or a lower pH will cause offloading of oxygen from hemoglobin, which is known as the Bohr effect.

=== Transport of hydrogen ions ===
Some oxyhemoglobin loses oxygen and becomes deoxyhemoglobin. Deoxyhemoglobin binds most of the hydrogen ions as it has a much greater affinity for more hydrogen than does oxyhemoglobin.

=== Lymphatic system ===
In mammals, blood is in equilibrium with lymph, which is continuously formed in tissues from blood by capillary ultrafiltration. Lymph is collected by a system of small lymphatic vessels and directed to the thoracic duct, which drains into the left subclavian vein, where lymph rejoins the systemic blood circulation.

=== Thermoregulation ===
Blood circulation transports heat throughout the body, and adjustments to this flow are an important part of thermoregulation. Increasing blood flow to the surface (e.g., during warm weather or strenuous exercise) causes warmer skin, resulting in faster heat loss. In contrast, when the external temperature is low, blood flow to the extremities and surface of the skin is reduced to prevent heat loss and is circulated to the important organs of the body, preferentially.

=== Rate of flow ===
Rate of blood flow varies greatly between different organs. Liver has the most abundant blood supply with an approximate flow of 1350 ml/min. Kidney and brain are the second and the third most supplied organs, with 1100 ml/min and ~700 ml/min, respectively.

Relative rates of blood flow per 100 g of tissue are different, with kidney, adrenal gland and thyroid being the first, second and third most supplied tissues, respectively.

=== Hydraulic functions ===
The restriction of blood flow can also be used in specialized tissues to cause engorgement, resulting in an erection of that tissue; examples are the erectile tissue in the penis and clitoris.

Another example of a hydraulic function is the jumping spider, in which blood forced into the legs under pressure causes them to straighten for a powerful jump, without the need for bulky muscular legs.

== Color ==
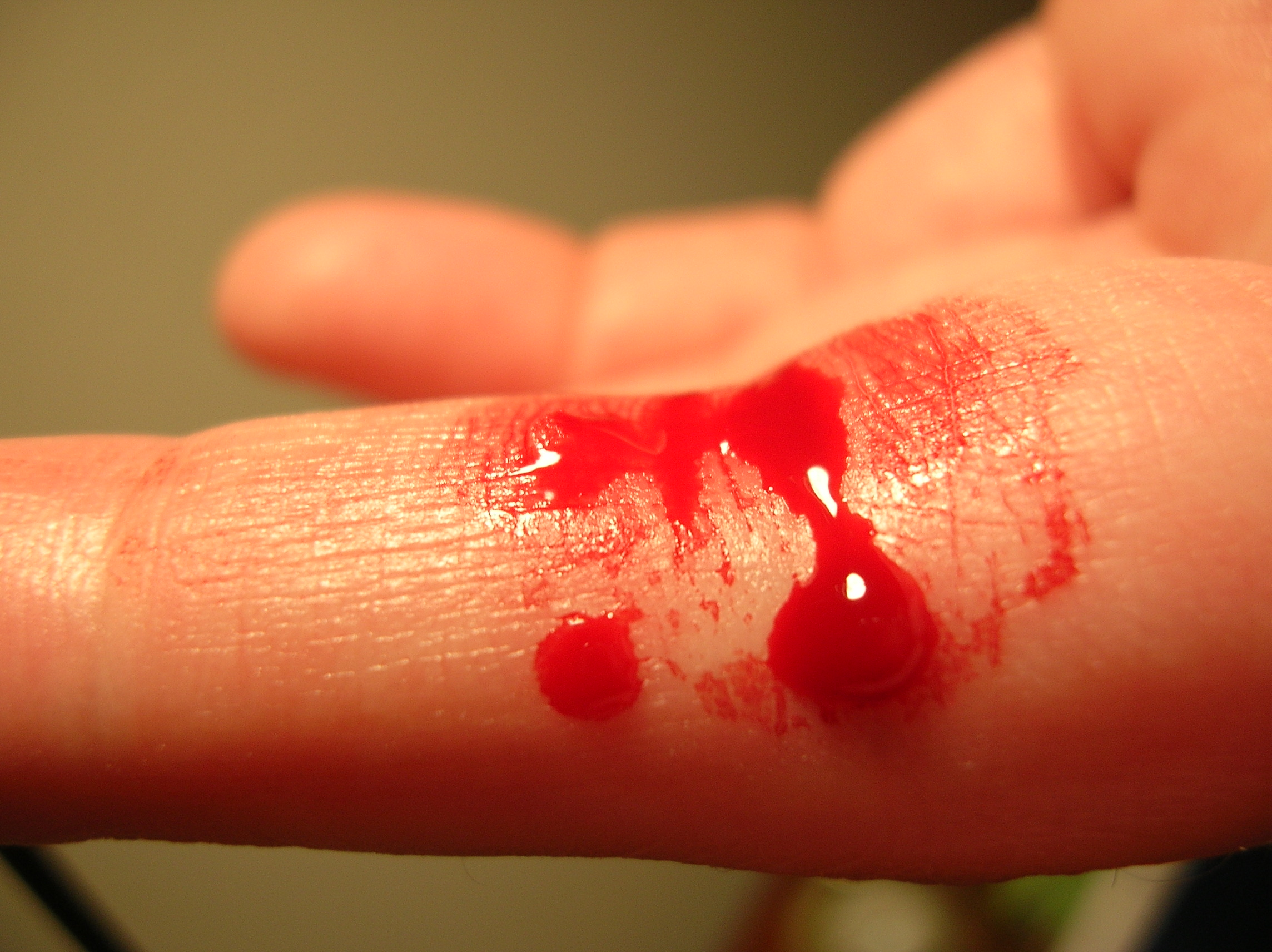
Capillary blood from a bleeding finger

Hemoglobin is the principal determinant of the color of blood (hemochrome). Each molecule has four heme groups, and their interaction with various molecules alters the exact color. Arterial blood and capillary blood are bright red, as oxygen imparts a strong red color to the heme group. Deoxygenated blood is a darker shade of red; this is present in veins, and can be seen during blood donation and when venous blood samples are taken. This is because the spectrum of light absorbed by hemoglobin differs between the oxygenated and deoxygenated states.

Blood in carbon monoxide poisoning is bright red, because carbon monoxide causes the formation of carboxyhemoglobin. In cyanide poisoning, the body cannot use oxygen, so the venous blood remains oxygenated, increasing the redness. There are some conditions affecting the heme groups present in hemoglobin that can make the skin appear blue – a symptom called cyanosis. If the heme is oxidized, methemoglobin, which is more brownish and cannot transport oxygen, is formed. In the rare condition sulfhemoglobinemia, arterial hemoglobin is partially oxygenated, and appears dark red with a bluish hue.

Veins close to the surface of the skin appear blue for a variety of reasons. However, the factors that contribute to this alteration of color perception are related to the light-scattering properties of the skin and the processing of visual input by the visual cortex, rather than the actual color of the venous blood.

Skinks in the genus Prasinohaema have green blood due to a buildup of the waste product biliverdin.

== Disorders ==
=== General medical ===
- Disorders of volume
  - Injury can cause blood loss through bleeding. A healthy adult can lose almost 20% of blood volume (1 L) before the first symptom, restlessness, begins, and 40% of volume (2 L) before shock sets in. Thrombocytes are important for blood coagulation and the formation of blood clots, which can stop bleeding. Trauma to the internal organs or bones can cause internal bleeding, which can sometimes be severe.
  - Dehydration can reduce the blood volume by reducing the water content of the blood. This would rarely result in shock (apart from the very severe cases) but may result in orthostatic hypotension and fainting.
- Disorders of circulation
  - Shock is the ineffective perfusion of tissues, and can be caused by a variety of conditions including blood loss, infection, and poor cardiac output.
  - Atherosclerosis reduces the flow of blood through arteries, because atheroma lines arteries and narrows them. Atheroma tends to increase with age, and its progression can be compounded by many causes including smoking, hypertension, excess circulating lipids (hyperlipidemia), and diabetes mellitus.
  - Coagulation can form a thrombosis, which can obstruct vessels.
  - Problems with blood composition, the pumping action of the heart, or narrowing of blood vessels can have many consequences including hypoxia (lack of oxygen) of the tissues supplied. The term ischemia refers to tissue that is inadequately perfused with blood, and infarction refers to tissue death (necrosis), which can occur when the blood supply has been blocked (or is very inadequate).

=== Hematological ===
- Anemia
  - Insufficient red cell mass (anemia) can be the result of bleeding, blood disorders like thalassemia, or nutritional deficiencies, and may require one or more blood transfusions. Anemia can also be due to a genetic disorder in which the red blood cells do not function effectively. Anemia can be confirmed by a blood test if the hemoglobin value is less than 13.5 gm/dl in men or less than 12.0 gm/dl in women. Several countries have blood banks to fill the demand for transfusable blood. A person receiving a blood transfusion must have a blood type compatible with that of the donor.
  - Sickle-cell anemia
- Disorders of cell proliferation
  - Leukemia is a group of cancers of the blood-forming tissues and cells.
  - Non-cancerous overproduction of red cells (polycythemia vera) or platelets (essential thrombocytosis) may be premalignant.
  - Myelodysplastic syndromes involve ineffective production of one or more cell lines.
- Disorders of coagulation
  - Hemophilia is a genetic illness that causes dysfunction in one of the blood's clotting mechanisms. This can allow otherwise inconsequential wounds to be life-threatening, but more commonly results in hemarthrosis, or bleeding into joint spaces, which can be crippling.
  - Ineffective or insufficient platelets can also result in coagulopathy (bleeding disorders).
  - Hypercoagulable state (thrombophilia) results from defects in regulation of platelet or clotting factor function, and can cause thrombosis.
- Infectious disorders of blood
  - Blood is an important vector of infection. HIV, the virus that causes AIDS, is transmitted through contact with blood, semen or other body secretions of an infected person. Hepatitis B and C are transmitted primarily through blood contact. Owing to blood-borne infections, bloodstained objects are treated as a biohazard.
  - Bacterial infection of the blood is bacteremia or sepsis. Viral Infection is viremia. Malaria and trypanosomiasis are blood-borne parasitic infections.

=== Carbon monoxide poisoning ===
Substances other than oxygen can bind to hemoglobin; in some cases, this can cause irreversible damage to the body. Carbon monoxide, for example, is extremely dangerous when carried to the blood via the lungs by inhalation, because carbon monoxide irreversibly binds to hemoglobin to form carboxyhemoglobin, so that less hemoglobin is free to bind oxygen, and fewer oxygen molecules can be transported throughout the blood. This can cause suffocation.

== Treatments ==
=== Transfusion ===
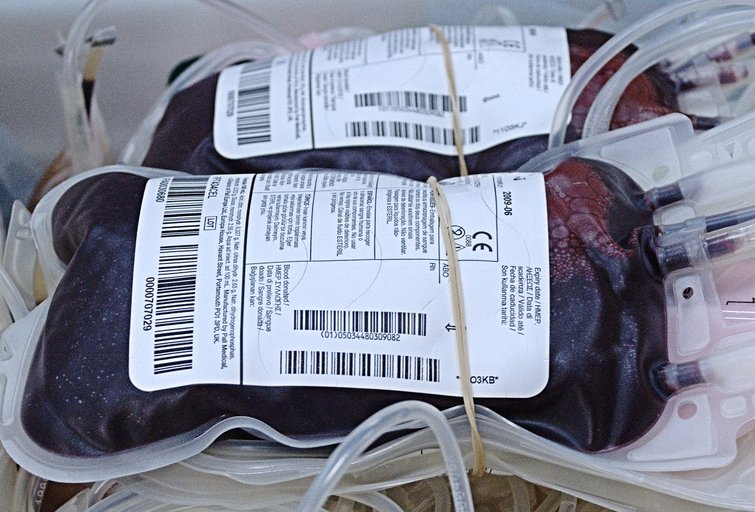
Venous blood collected during blood donation

Blood for transfusion is obtained from human donors by blood donation and stored in a blood bank. There are many different blood types in humans, the ABO blood group system, and the Rhesus blood group system being the most important. Transfusion of blood of an incompatible blood group may cause severe, often fatal, complications, so crossmatching is done to ensure that a compatible blood product is transfused.

Other blood products administered intravenously are platelets, blood plasma, cryoprecipitate, and specific coagulation factor concentrates.

=== Intravenous administration ===
Many forms of medication (from antibiotics to chemotherapy) are administered intravenously, as they are not readily or adequately absorbed by the digestive tract.

After severe acute blood loss, liquid preparations, generically known as plasma expanders, can be given intravenously, either solutions of salts (NaCl, KCl, CaCl_{2} etc.) at physiological concentrations, or colloidal solutions, such as dextrans, human serum albumin, or fresh frozen plasma. In these emergency situations, a plasma expander is a more effective life-saving procedure than a blood transfusion, because the metabolism of transfused red blood cells does not restart immediately after a transfusion.

=== Letting ===
In modern evidence-based medicine, bloodletting is used in management of a few rare diseases, including hemochromatosis and polycythemia. However, bloodletting and leeching were common unvalidated interventions used until the 19th century, as many diseases were incorrectly thought to be due to an excess of blood, according to Hippocratic medicine.

== Etymology ==
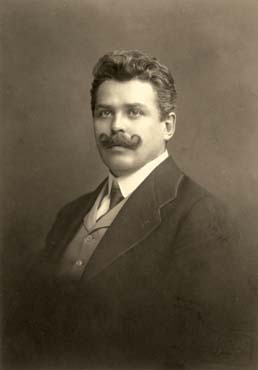
Jan Janský is credited with the first classification of blood into four types (A, B, AB, and O)

English blood (Old English blod) derives from Germanic and has cognates with a similar range of meanings in all other Germanic languages (e.g. German Blut, Swedish blod, Gothic blōþ). There is no accepted Indo-European etymology.

== History ==
=== Classical Greek medicine ===
Robin Fåhræus (a Swedish physician who devised the erythrocyte sedimentation rate) suggested that the Ancient Greek system of humorism, wherein the body was thought to contain four distinct bodily fluids (associated with different temperaments), were based upon the observation of blood clotting in a transparent container. When blood is drawn in a glass container and left undisturbed for about an hour, four different layers can be seen. A dark clot forms at the bottom (the "black bile"). Above the clot is a layer of red blood cells (the "blood"). Above this is a whitish layer of white blood cells (the "phlegm"). The top layer is clear yellow serum (the "yellow bile").

In general, Greek thinkers believed that blood was made from food. Plato and Aristotle are two important sources of evidence for this view, but it dates back to Homer's Iliad. Plato thought that fire in our bellies transformed food into blood, and that the movements of air in the body as we breathed carried the fire as it transformed our food into blood. Aristotle believed that food is concocted into blood in the heart and transformed into our body's matter.

=== Types ===
The ABO blood group system was discovered in the year 1900 by Karl Landsteiner. Jan Janský is credited with the first classification of blood into the four types (A, B, AB, and O) in 1907, which remains in use today. In 1907 the first blood transfusion was performed that used the ABO system to predict compatibility. The first non-direct transfusion was performed on 27 March 1914. The Rhesus factor was discovered in 1937.

== Culture and religion ==
Due to its importance to life, blood is associated with a large number of beliefs. One of the most basic is the use of blood as a symbol for family relationships through birth/parentage; to be "related by blood" is to be related by ancestry or descendence, rather than marriage. This bears closely to bloodlines, and sayings such as "blood is thicker than water" and "bad blood", as well as "Blood brother".

Blood is given particular emphasis in the Islamic, Jewish, and Christian religions, because Leviticus 17:11 says "the life of a creature is in the blood." This phrase is part of the Levitical law forbidding the drinking of blood or eating meat with the blood still intact instead of being poured off.

Mythic references to blood can sometimes be connected to the life-giving nature of blood, seen in such events as childbirth, as contrasted with the blood of injury or death.

=== Indigenous Australians ===
In many indigenous Australian Aboriginal peoples' traditions, ochre (particularly red) and blood, both high in iron content and considered Maban, are applied to the bodies of dancers for ritual. As Lawlor states:

In many Aboriginal rituals and ceremonies, red ochre is rubbed all over the naked bodies of the dancers. In secret, sacred male ceremonies, blood extracted from the veins of the participant's arms is exchanged and rubbed on their bodies. Red ochre is used in similar ways in less-secret ceremonies. Blood is also used to fasten the feathers of birds onto people's bodies. Bird feathers contain a protein that is highly magnetically sensitive.

Lawlor comments that blood employed in this fashion is held by these peoples to attune the dancers to the invisible energetic realm of the Dreamtime. Lawlor then connects these invisible energetic realms and magnetic fields, because iron is magnetic.

=== European paganism ===
Among the Germanic tribes, blood was used during their sacrifices; the Blóts. The blood was considered to have the power of its originator, and, after the butchering, the blood was sprinkled on the walls, on the statues of the gods, and on the participants themselves. This act of sprinkling blood was called blóedsian in Old English, and the terminology was borrowed by the Roman Catholic Church becoming to bless and blessing. The Hittite word for blood, ishar was a cognate to words for "oath" and "bond", see Ishara. The Ancient Greeks believed that the blood of the gods, ichor, was a substance that was poisonous to mortals.

As a relic of Germanic Law, the cruentation, an ordeal where the corpse of the victim was supposed to start bleeding in the presence of the murderer, was used until the early 17th century.

=== Christianity ===
In Genesis 9:4, God prohibited Noah and his sons from eating blood (see Noahide Law). This command continued to be observed by the Eastern Orthodox Church.

It is also found in the Bible that when the Angel of Death came around to the Hebrew house that the first-born child would not die if the angel saw lamb's blood wiped across the doorway.

At the Council of Jerusalem, the apostles prohibited certain Christians from consuming blood – this is documented in Acts 15:20 and 29. This chapter specifies a reason (especially in verses 19–21): It was to avoid offending Jews who had become Christians, because the Mosaic Law Code prohibited the practice.

Christ's blood is the means for the atonement of sins. Also, "... the blood of Jesus Christ his [God] Son cleanseth us from all sin." (1 John 1:7), "... Unto him [God] that loved us, and washed us from our sins in his own blood." (Revelation 1:5), and "And they overcame him (Satan) by the blood of the Lamb [Jesus the Christ], and by the word of their testimony ..." (Revelation 12:11).

Some Christian churches, including Roman Catholicism, Eastern Orthodoxy, Oriental Orthodoxy, and the Assyrian Church of the East teach that, when consecrated, the Eucharistic wine actually becomes the blood of Jesus for worshippers to drink. Thus in the consecrated wine, Jesus becomes spiritually and physically present. This teaching is rooted in the Last Supper, as written in the four gospels of the Bible, in which Jesus stated to his disciples that the bread that they ate was his body, and the wine was his blood. "This cup is the new testament in my blood, which is shed for you." (Luke 22:20).

Most forms of Protestantism, especially those of a Methodist or Presbyterian lineage, teach that the wine is no more than a symbol of the blood of Christ, who is spiritually but not physically present. Lutheran theology teaches that the body and blood is present together "in, with, and under" the bread and wine of the Eucharistic feast.

=== Judaism ===
In Judaism, animal blood may not be consumed even in the smallest quantity (Leviticus 3:17 and elsewhere); this is reflected in Jewish dietary laws (Kashrut). Blood is purged from meat by rinsing and soaking in water (to loosen clots), salting and then rinsing with water again several times. Eggs must also be checked and any blood spots removed before consumption. Although blood from fish is biblically kosher, it is rabbinically forbidden to consume fish blood to avoid the appearance of breaking the Biblical prohibition.

Another ritual involving blood involves the covering of the blood of fowl and game after slaughtering (Leviticus 17:13); the reason given by the Torah is: "Because the life of the animal is [in] its blood" (ibid 17:14). In relation to human beings, Kabbalah expounds on this verse that the animal soul of a person is in the blood, and that physical desires stem from it.

Likewise, the mystical reason for salting temple sacrifices and slaughtered meat is to remove the blood of animal-like passions from the person. By removing the animal's blood, the animal energies and life-force contained in the blood are removed, making the meat fit for human consumption.

=== Islam ===
Consumption of food containing blood is forbidden by Islamic dietary laws. This is derived from the statement in the Qur'an, sura Al-Ma'ida (5:3): "Forbidden to you (for food) are: dead meat, blood, the flesh of swine, and that on which has been invoked the name of other than Allah."

Blood is considered unclean, hence there are specific methods to obtain physical and ritual status of cleanliness once bleeding has occurred. Specific rules and prohibitions apply to menstruation, postnatal bleeding and irregular vaginal bleeding. When an animal has been slaughtered, the animal's neck is cut in a way to ensure that the spine is not severed, hence the brain may send commands to the heart to pump blood to it for oxygen. In this way, blood is removed from the body, and the meat is generally now safe to cook and eat. In modern times, blood transfusions are generally not considered against the rules.

=== Jehovah's Witnesses ===
Based on their interpretation of scriptures such as Acts 15:28, 29 ("Keep abstaining...from blood."), many Jehovah's Witnesses neither consume blood nor accept transfusions of whole blood or its major components: red blood cells, white blood cells, platelets (thrombocytes), and plasma. Members may personally decide whether they will accept medical procedures that involve their own blood or substances that are further fractionated from the four major components.

=== Vampirism ===
Vampires are mythical creatures that drink blood directly for sustenance, usually with a preference for human blood. Cultures all over the world have myths of this kind; for example the 'Nosferatu' legend, a human who achieves damnation and immortality by drinking the blood of others, originates from Eastern European folklore. Ticks, leeches, female mosquitoes, vampire bats, and an assortment of other natural creatures do consume the blood of other animals, but only bats are associated with vampires. This has no relation to vampire bats, which are New World creatures discovered well after the origins of the European myths.

== Invertebrates ==
In invertebrates, a body fluid analogous to blood called hemolymph is found, the main difference being that hemolymph is not contained in a closed circulatory system. Hemolymph may function to carry oxygen, although hemoglobin is not necessarily used. Crustaceans and mollusks use hemocyanin instead of hemoglobin. In most insects, their hemolymph does not contain oxygen-carrying molecules because their bodies are small enough for their tracheal system to suffice for supplying oxygen.

== Other uses ==
=== Forensic and archaeological ===
Blood residue can help forensic investigators identify weapons, reconstruct a criminal action, and link suspects to the crime. Through bloodstain pattern analysis, forensic information can also be gained from the spatial distribution of bloodstains.

Blood residue analysis is also a technique used in archeology.

=== Artistic ===
Blood is one of the body fluids that has been used in art. In particular, the performances of Viennese Actionist Hermann Nitsch, Istvan Kantor, Franko B, Lennie Lee, Ron Athey, Yang Zhichao, Lucas Abela and Kira O'Reilly, along with the photography of Andres Serrano, have incorporated blood as a prominent visual element. Marc Quinn has made sculptures using frozen blood, including a cast of his own head made using his own blood.

=== Genealogical ===
The term bloodline is used in genealogy to refer to one's ancestry, origins, and ethnic background. Other terms where blood is used in a family history sense are blue-blood, royal blood, mixed-blood and blood relative.

== See also ==
- Autotransfusion
- Blood as food
- Blood pressure
- Blood substitutes ("artificial blood")
- Blood test
- Hematology
- Hemophobia
- Hemodynamics
- Hemorheology
- Luminol, a visual test for blood left at crime scenes.
- Oct-1-en-3-one ("Smell" of blood)
- Taboo food and drink § Blood
