= CO-oximeter =

Oxygen measuring device

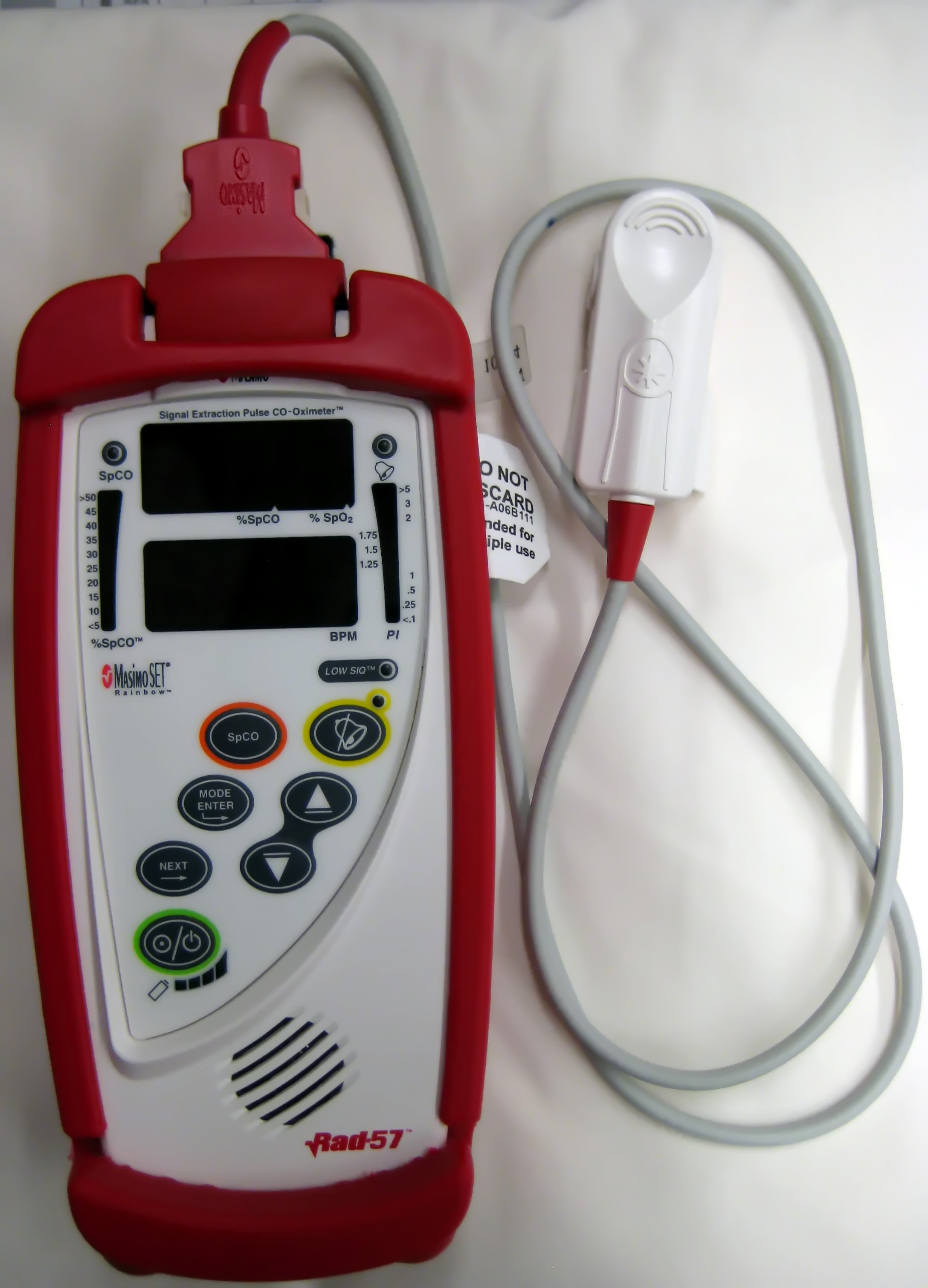
Finger tip carboxyhemoglobin saturation monitor.

A pulse CO-oximeter is a non-invasive, multi-wavelength instrument that measures the oxygen carrying state of hemoglobin in a blood specimen, including oxygen-carrying hemoglobin (O2Hb), non-oxygen-carrying but normal hemoglobin (HHb) as well as the dyshemoglobins such as carboxyhemoglobin (COHb) and methemoglobin (MetHb). Pulse CO-oximeters use four or more wavelengths whereas the common pulse oxymeter uses only two. Simpler oximeters measure only the ratio of oxyhemoglobin to total 'bindable' hemoglobin (i.e. oxyhemoglobin + deoxyhemoglobin-HHb) and as a result will incorrectly report the true oxygen saturation in patients with significant dyshemoglobin levels. CO-oximetry is useful in defining the causes for hypoxemia, or hypoxia, (oxygen deficiency at the tissue level).

== Mechanism ==
A CO-oximeter measures the absorption of light passing through blood at multiple wavelengths of light to several dozens of wavelengths, in order to distinguish oxyhemoglobin, and deoxyhemoglobin, and thus determine the oxyhemoglobin saturation (the percentage of oxygenated hemoglobin compared to the total amount of available hemoglobin (Hb)). Measurement of greater numbers of wavelengths enables the instrument to distinguish between these and carboxyhemoglobin,-COHb, methemoglobin -metHb, other hemoglobin moieties and 'background' light-absorbing species. Traditionally, measurement is made from arterial blood processed in a specific device designed to be able to measure proportions of multiple components of several hemoglobin moieties using multi-wavelength spectrophotometry and complex, but straightforward internal computations. While these units still are in wide use, blood gas analyzers with integral CO-oximetry modules have also been developed and successfully marketed by several manufacturers. More recently, some 'pulse' or more precisely 'peripheral' oximeters have made it possible to estimate carboxyhemoglobin with non-invasive technology similar to a simple (peripheral) pulse oximeter. In contrast, the use of a standard or simple pulse oximeter is not effective in the diagnosis of CO poisoning as patients who have carbon monoxide poisoning may have a normal oxygen saturation reading on a pulse oximeter.

== Usage ==
When a patient presents with carbon monoxide poisoning (CO) or other non-respiratory hypoxic symptoms, most current CO-oximeters will detect the relative levels of each hemoglobin fraction (oxyhemoglobin and dyshemoglobins) and likely the oxyhemoglobin saturation. For any system making these measurements it is critical that the device clearly distinguish between Oxygen Saturation' and Fractional Oxyhemoglobin" . The issue here is the careless use of saturation vs. fractional oxyhemoglobin, which both measure the same entity -oxyhemoglobin- but the oxygen saturation uses as its base only the hemoglobin available for binding, while the fractional oxyhemoglobin uses the total hemoglobin in the sample as its base. In normal subjects the values are nearly identical-thus leading to terminologic and possibly clinical confusion. A simple oximeter measuring only oxygen derivatives, may report a normal saturation or even a hyperoxic state if oxygen gas has been administered when in fact there is serious compromise of oxygen carrying ability of the hemoglobin present.

== See also ==
- Breath carbon monoxide
