= Carbaminohemoglobin =

Compound of hemoglobin and carbon dioxide

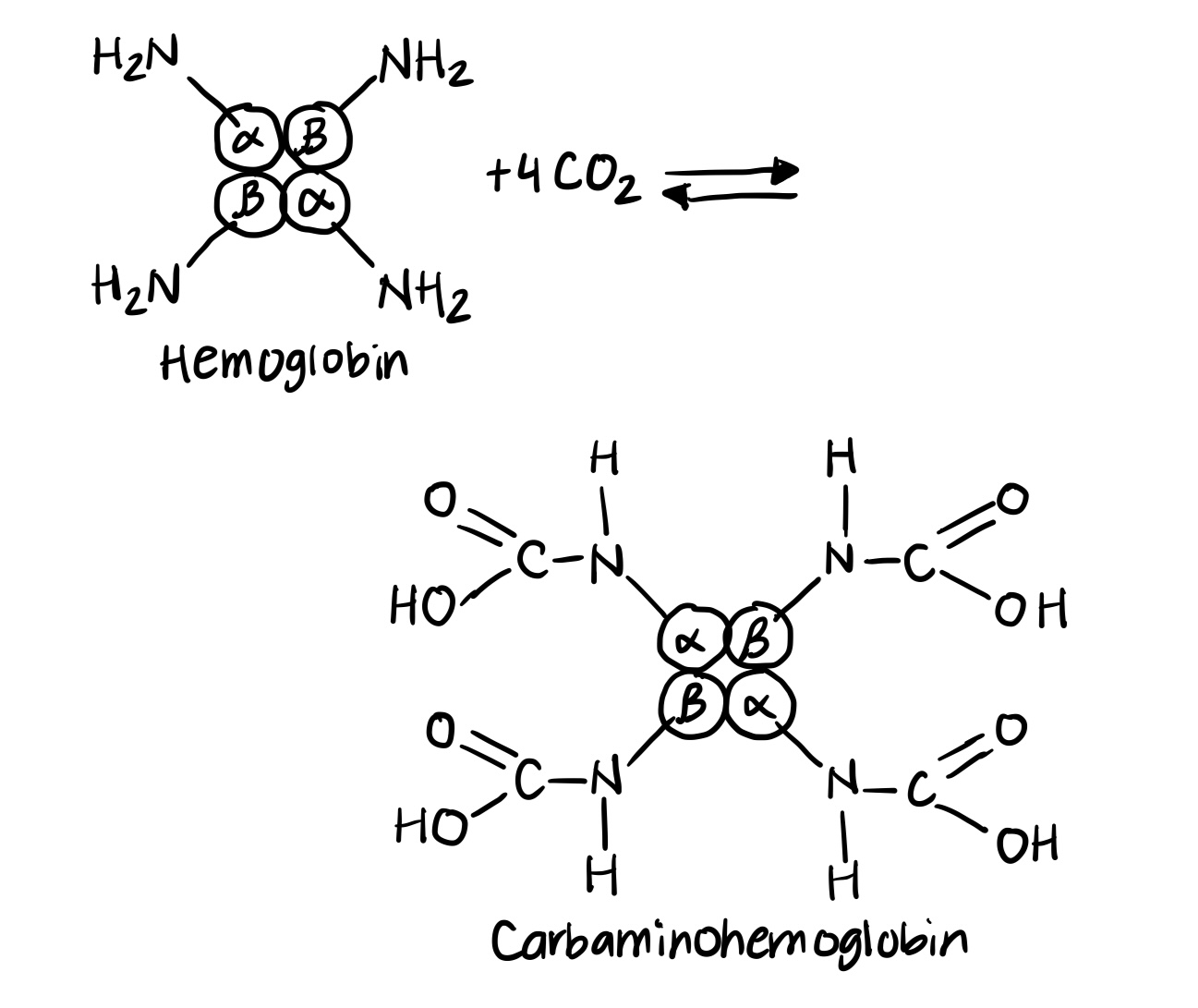
Binding of carbon dioxide to hemoglobin to form carbaminohemoglobin

Carbaminohemoglobin (carbaminohaemoglobin BrE) (CO_{2}Hb, also known as carbheamoglobin and carbohemoglobin) is a compound of hemoglobin and carbon dioxide, and is one of the forms in which carbon dioxide exists in the blood. In blood, 23% of carbon dioxide is carried this way, while 70% is converted into bicarbonate by carbonic anhydrase and then carried in plasma, and 7% carried as free CO_{2}, dissolved in plasma.

== Structure ==
The structure of carbaminohemoglobin can be described as the binding of carbon dioxide to the amino groups of the globin chains of hemoglobin. This occurs at the N-terminals of the globin chains and at the amino sidebranches of arginine and lysine residues. The process of carbon dioxide binding to hemoglobin is generally known as carbamino formation. This is the source from where the protein gets its name, as it is a combination of carbamino and hemoglobin.

== Function ==
One of the primary functions of carbaminohemoglobin is to enable the transport of carbon dioxide in the bloodstream. When carbon dioxide is produced as a waste product of cellular metabolism in tissues, the compound is diffused into the bloodstream and it works to react with hemoglobin.

When the binding of molecules occurs to form carbaminohemoglobin, it allows for the transport of carbon dioxide from the tissues to the lungs. Once it is in the lungs, carbon dioxide is released from carbaminohemoglobin and can be let out from the body during the exhalation process. This complete process is very important for maintaining the balance of gases in the blood and to ensure that gas exchange is being transported between tissues and organs.

== Interaction ==
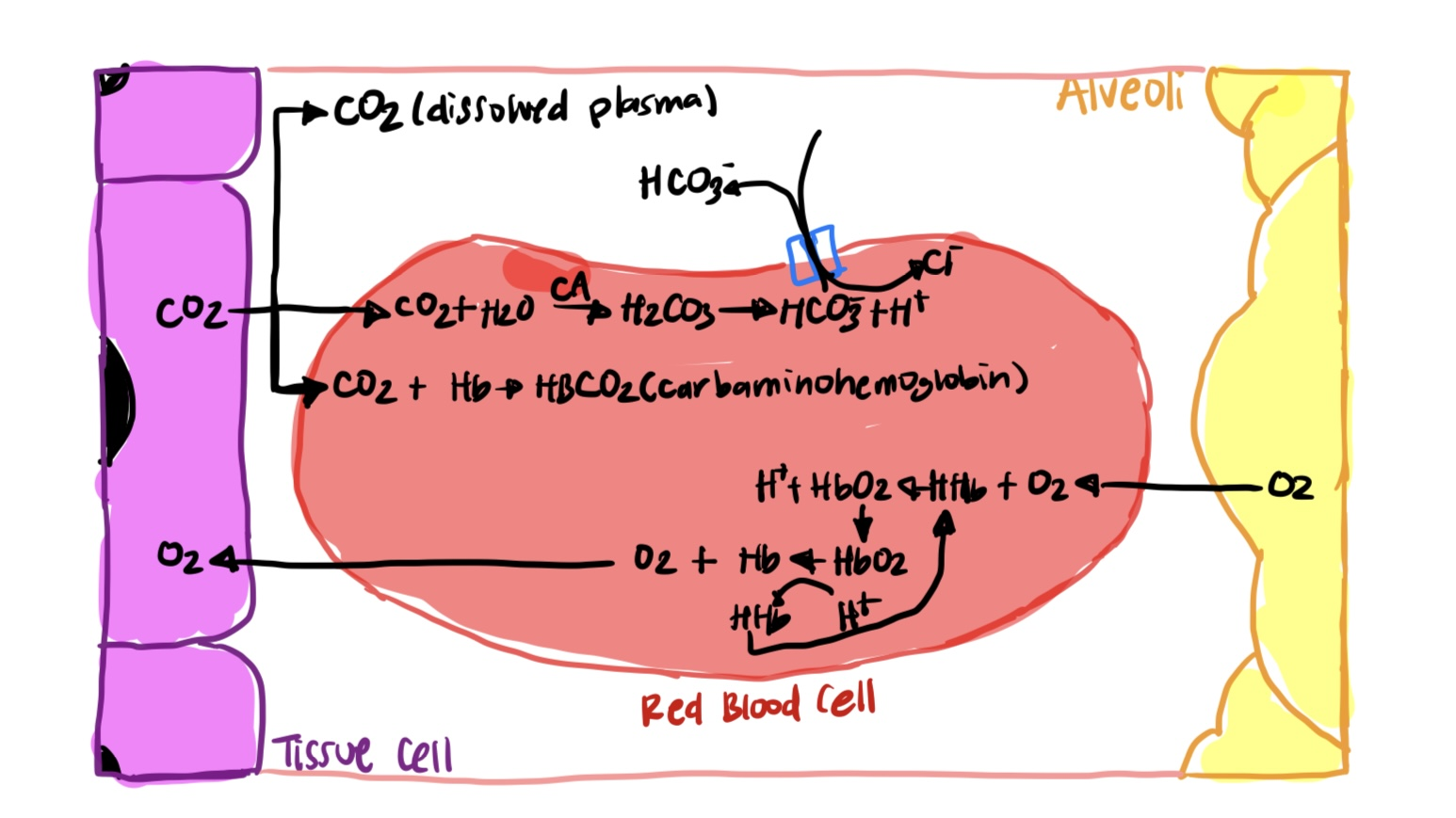
Binding and unbinding of oxygen and carbon dioxide in red blood cells between lungs and tissue

Carbaminohemoglobin interacts with carbon dioxide in the respiratory gas exchange process. The interaction involves the binding of carbon dioxide to hemoglobin. Carbon dioxide binds to the protein chains of hemoglobin. The ability of hemoglobin to bind to both oxygen and carbon dioxide molecules is what makes it an important protein to the respiratory system in respiratory gas exchange.

The interactions between carbon dioxide and hemoglobin helps in the transport of carbon dioxide from the tissues to the lungs for elimination. When carbon dioxide is transported from the tissues, it is produced as a waste product of cellular metabolism. Most importantly, the binding of carbon dioxide to hemoglobin helps buffer blood pH by preventing carbonic acid from decreasing the pH.

Although, the carbaminohemoglobin protein interacts with another protein (like hemoglobin) found in red blood cells, this interaction only takes place in the bloodstream and its products can be expelled. Carbaminohemoglobin does not interact with DNA because DNA is in the nucleus.

== Regulation ==
The formation and dissociation of the protein carbaminohemoglobin are controlled by many factors to guarantee the transport of carbon dioxide to the blood stream. A list of regulatory factors are listed below:

1. Partial Pressure of Carbon Dioxide (pCO_{2}): The measure of carbon dioxide within arterial or venous blood. The amount of carbon dioxide in the bloodstream is influenced by the partial pressure of the molecule carbon dioxide. In tissues where cellular metabolism produces carbon dioxide, the partial pressure is higher and it leads to the binding of carbon dioxide to hemoglobin. On the other hand, in the lungs, there is a lower partial pressure of carbon dioxide, which promotes the separation of carbon dioxide from hemoglobin.
2. pH: The Bohr effect outlines how the binding and release of oxygen and carbon dioxide by hemoglobin are influenced by fluctuations of pH in the blood. When tissues metabolize, they produce carbon dioxide and acidic products, which eventually lead to a decrease in pH levels in the blood. When the pH is low, this promotes the binding of carbon dioxide to hemoglobin and facilities the transport to the lungs. On the contrary, when the pH is higher in the lungs, carbon dioxide is released from hemoglobin.
3. Temperature: A factor such as temperature can affect the binding and release of gases by hemoglobin. The effect of temperature on the binding of carbon dioxide to hemoglobin is less noticeable compared to other gases, but this factor can still have an influence on the overall regulation of gas exchange.
4. Concentration of Bicarbonate (HCO_{3}^{−}): A high percentage of carbon dioxide in the bloodstream is transferred in the form of bicarbonate ions. Carbonic anhydrase catalyzes the conversion of carbon dioxide and water into carbonic acid. This molecule breaks down into bicarbonate and hydrogen ions. This break down process occurs in red blood cells. Ultimately, the concentration of bicarbonate ions in the bloodstream affects the formation of the protein carbaminohemoglobin in the body.

== Synthesis ==
When the tissues release carbon dioxide into the bloodstream, around 10% is dissolved into the plasma. The rest of the carbon dioxide is carried either directly or indirectly by hemoglobin. Approximately 10% of the carbon dioxide carried by hemoglobin is in the form of carbaminohemoglobin. This carbaminohemoglobin is formed by the reaction between carbon dioxide and an amino (-NH_{2}) residue from the globin molecule, resulting in the formation of a carbamino residue (-NH.COO^{−}). The rest of the carbon dioxide is transported in the plasma as bicarbonate anions.

== Mechanism ==
When carbon dioxide binds to hemoglobin, carbaminohemoglobin is formed, lowering hemoglobin's affinity for oxygen via the Bohr effect. The reaction is formed between a carbon dioxide molecule and an amino residue. In the absence of oxygen, unbound hemoglobin molecules have a greater chance of becoming carbaminohemoglobin. The Haldane effect relates to the increased affinity of de-oxygenated hemoglobin for H^{+}: offloading of oxygen to the tissues thus results in increased affinity of the hemoglobin for carbon dioxide, and H^{+}, which the body needs to get rid of, which can then be transported to the lung for removal. Because the formation of this compound generates hydrogen ions, haemoglobin is needed to buffer it.

Hemoglobin can bind to four molecules of carbon dioxide. The carbon dioxide molecules form a carbamate with the four terminal-amine groups of the four protein chains in the deoxy form of the molecule. Thus, one hemoglobin molecule can transport four carbon dioxide molecules back to the lungs, where they are released when the molecule changes back to the oxyhemoglobin form.

=== Hydrogen ion and oxygen-carbon dioxide coupling ===
When carbon dioxide diffuses as a dissolved gas from the tissue capillaries, it binds to the α-amino terminus of the globulin chain, forming Carbaminohemoglobin. Carbaminohemoglobin is able to directly stabilise the T conformation as part of the carbon dioxide Bohr effect. Deoxyhemoglobin in turn subsequently increases the uptake of carbon dioxide in the form of favouring the formation of Bicarbonate as well as Carbaminohemoglobin through the Haldane effect.

== Disease association ==
Dysfunctional or altered levels of carbaminohemoglobin do not generally cause disease or disorders. Carbaminohemoglobin is a part of the carbon dioxide transport process in the body. The levels of this protein can decrease and increase based on factors that regulate the protein in the body.

A way that carbaminohemoglobin can be associated with disease is when there is a change in its level caused by a pre-existing condition or imbalance in the respiratory and metabolic systems of the human body.

Some of these existing medical conditions can be the following:

1. Respiratory acidosis: This condition is characterized by a build up of carbon dioxide in the blood, which leads to a drop in the blood's pH. This occurs when there is an impairment in the gas exchange process, such as respiratory failure.
2. Hypoventilation: This type of condition can result in higher levels of carbaminohemoglobin. This condition can be caused by many factors, such as central nervous system disorders, and even some medications.

== Biological Importance ==
The protein carbaminohemoglobin plays an important role in the transport of carbon dioxide in the blood, and its biologically important in many functions:

1. Transporting Carbon Dioxide: This process allows for the transport of carbon dioxide from the tissues to the lungs. It is essential for maintaining the balance of gases in the bloodstream and to guarantee the removal of waste carbon dioxide from the body.
2. Buffering Blood pH: The binding of carbon dioxide to hemoglobin helps buffer blood pH. When tissues produce carbon dioxide, the increase in acidity is reduced by forming bicarbonate ions. This buffering process helps prevent a decrease in pH and helps maintain a stable environment.
3. Facilitating Gas Exchange: Hemoglobin facilitates the exchange of gases in the lungs and tissues. In the lungs, oxygen binds to hemoglobin and carbon dioxide is released. In the tissues, carbon dioxide binds to form carbaminohemoglobin and oxygen is released. This exchange process is important because tissues need oxygen supplied and carbon dioxide removed.

== See also ==
- Hemoglobin
- Blood
- Carbamic acid
- Carbamino
