= Breath carbon monoxide =

Level of carbon monoxide in exhaled breath

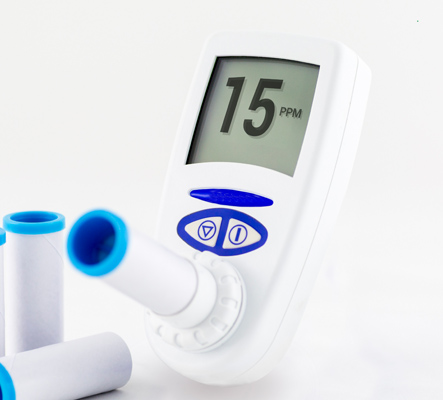
Breath carbon monoxide device

Breath carbon monoxide is the level of carbon monoxide in a person's exhalation. It can be measured in a breath carbon monoxide test, generally by using a carbon monoxide breath monitor (breath CO monitor), such as for motivation and education for smoking cessation and also as a clinical aid in assessing carbon monoxide poisoning. The breath carbon monoxide level has been shown to have a close relationship with the level of CO in the blood known as carboxyhaemoglobin (%COHb) or "blood CO". This correlation allows for the level of CO in the blood to be indirectly measured through a breath sample.

== Breath CO monitor ==
CO monitors measure carbon monoxide in parts per million (ppm) in breath. These monitors have become increasingly popular given that they allow for noninvasive testing and are inexpensive to use.

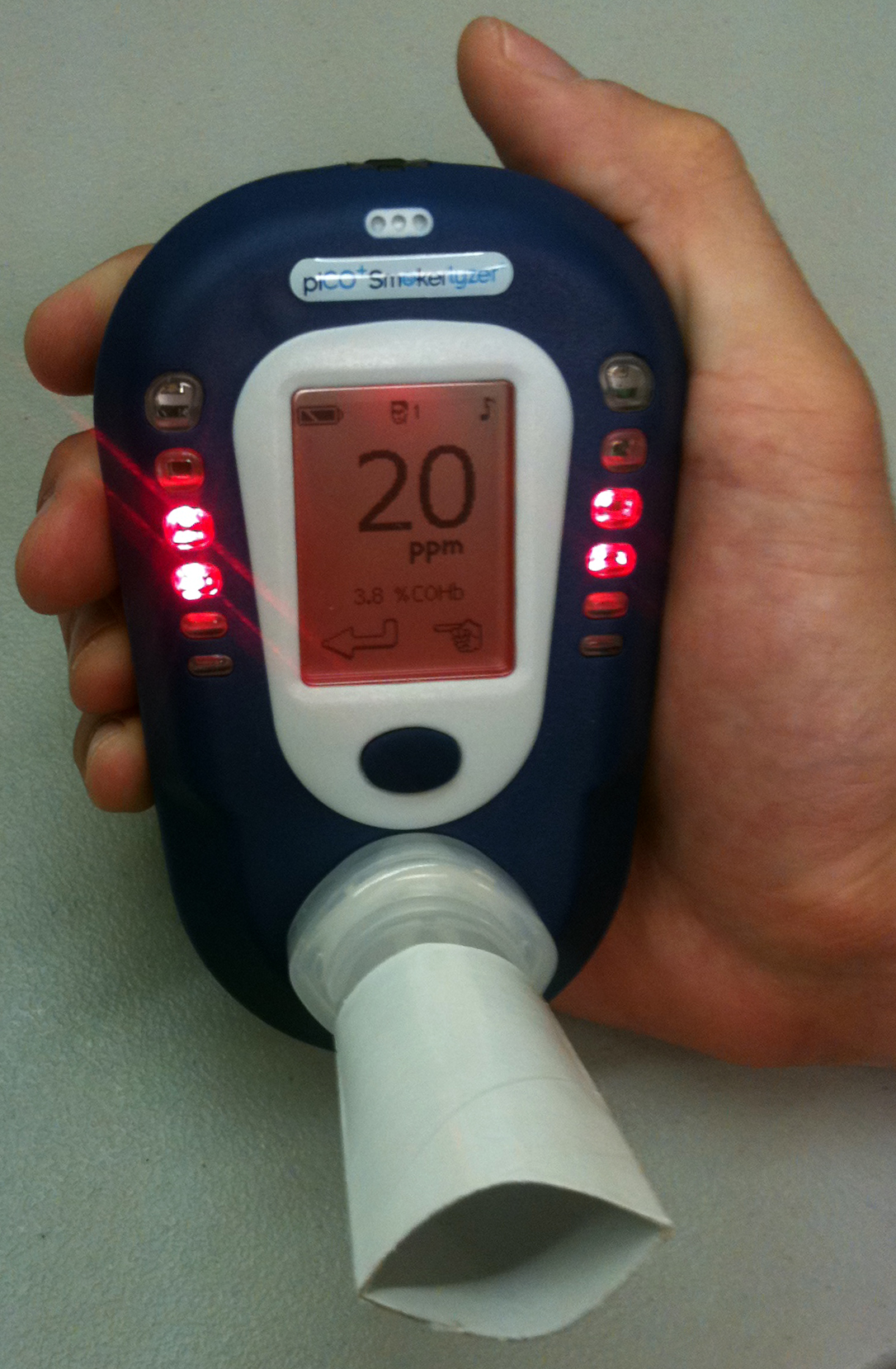
Common commercial breath CO monitor model, displaying a breath concentration reading with its corresponding blood concentration

Breath CO monitors function based on the detection of carbon monoxide gas with an electrochemical gas sensor. Monitors typically incorporate an LCD that provides a concentration level in a numeric format and/or colored indicators that correspond to various concentration ranges. Some device models also incorporate sound warnings when a pre-programmed concentration limit is exceeded.

The various models of CO monitors currently available on the market vary widely in terms of accuracy, functionality, and price. Monitors have been designed to fit the variety of applications that exist for Breath CO monitoring.

== Uses ==
=== Smoking cessation ===
As an aid to smoking cessation, a breath CO monitor can be used as a validational, motivational and educational tool. It has been referred to as the stethoscope of tobacco treatment. Breath CO monitoring provides an easy and low cost method of ascertaining smoking status without relying on a patient's self-report alone to determine whether or not they smoke. Self-reported smoking status has been shown to be unreliable, and a CO monitor replaces this.

The British National Institute for Clinical Excellence (NICE) stipulates that a non-smoker is identified by a reading of less than 10ppm CO. Recent NICE guidelines for pregnant smokers have been published stipulating a level of 7ppm as the identification of a non-smoker.

These devices are also useful on pregnant smokers. Recent clinical studies have also found that there is a direct link between the level of CO on an expectant mother's breath and the level of CO in her unborn child's blood. This is known as "Fetal carboxyhaemoglobin" (%FCOHb). This level has also been found to be on average 1.8 times higher in the baby than in the mother. This relationship is also used in some more advanced CO monitors in order to educate on the dangers of smoking whilst pregnant.

=== CO poisoning ===
CO breath monitors are used by the emergency services to help identify patients who are suspected of having CO poisoning. Carbon monoxide is a colorless, odorless, and tasteless gas which is therefore very difficult to detect. CO poisoning can occur in many situations where incomplete combustion is present, with the most common causes being house fires or faulty gas appliances. Although CO poisoning is rare, the British Health Protection Agency has produced an algorithm to help with the diagnosis of CO poisoning and what to do in the event of diagnosis. The use of breath monitoring on the scene of suspected exposure can allow the patient to receive treatment more rapidly and improve their odds of survival.

== See also ==
- CO-oximeter
