= Haldane effect =

Property of hemoglobin and oxygenation

The Haldane effect is a property of hemoglobin (Hb) that describes its ability to carry increased amounts of carbon dioxide (CO_{2}) in the deoxygenated state as opposed to the oxygenated state. The Haldane effects thus promotes uptake of CO_{2} by Hb in peripheral tissues where it releases oxygen to the tissue, and conversely promotes release of CO_{2} from Hb in the lungs where oxygen from inspired air again binds to Hb.

The Haldane effect is a result of a difference in the acidity of the oxygenated and deoxygenated (reduced) forms of Hb, so that the less acidic deoxygenated form favours direct binding of CO_{2} to Hb amino acid residues to form carbamino compounds (the more significant component), as well as the binding of H^{+} ions formed during the dissociation carbonic acid (to which CO_{2} is converted by erythrocyte carbonic anhydrase) (and vice versa).

The Haldane effect approximately doubles the transport (binding and release) capacity of blood for CO_{2}. It is far more important in promoting CO_{2} transport than the related Bohr effect is in promoting O_{2} transport.

It was first described by John Scott Haldane.

== Mechanism ==
Carbon dioxide is carried in blood in three forms: as dissolved gas, as dissociated carbonic acid (H_{2}CO_{3}), or bound to proteins in the form of carbamino compounds. The vast majority of CO_{2} is conveyed as HCO^{−}_{3}, with only minor contribution from the other two forms, however, this does not reflect the significance of these forms to the loading and unloading of CO_{2}: of the total venous-arterial difference, ~60% is attributable to HCO^{−}_{3}, 30% to carbamino compounds, and 10% to dissolved CO_{2}.

=== Carbaminohemoglobin ===
Carbon dioxide binding to amino groups results in the formation of carbamino (-NH-COOH) compounds. Amino groups are available for binding at the N-terminals and at side-chains of arginine and lysine residues of hemoglobin. When carbon dioxide binds to these residues, carbaminohemoglobin is formed. The capacity of Hb to bind CO_{2} in the form of carbamino groups is inversely proportional to the state of oxygenation of hemoglobin.

Almost all blood carbamino carriage of CO_{2} is performed by Hb, and deoxygenated Hb has a 3.5-fold greater capacity for carbamino carriage than oxygenated Hb. In contrast, carbamino carriage by plasma proteins is rather insignificant and is also not favoured due to the absence of carbonic anhydrase in plasma.

=== Ion buffering ===
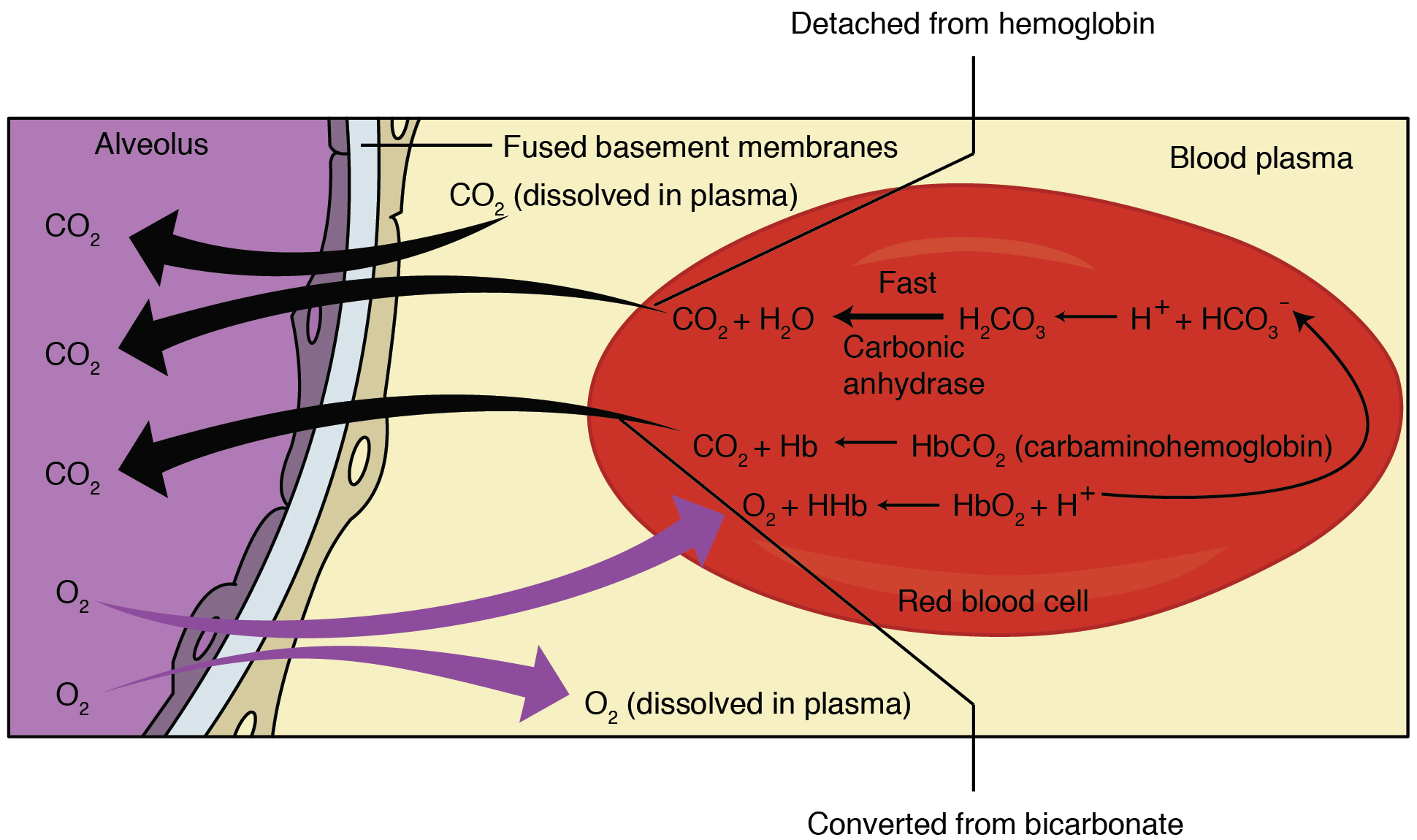

==== Buffering capacity of haemoglobin ====
Deoxygenated Hb is less acidic than oxygenated Hb, and therefore has a higher affinity for H^{+} ions (i.e. a better proton acceptor).

The imidazole group of histidine residues is virtually the sole amino acid residue capable of acting as a pH buffer within the physiological pH range, and accounts for the majority of Hb buffering power, with each Hb tetramer containing 38 histidine residues (buffering power of plasma proteins is far less and also almost entirely accounted by histidine residues). The hemes are attached to the globulins at imidazole groups of histidine residues, and the imidazoles' dissociation constant is highly dependent upon the (de)oxygenation state of Hb. Deoxygenation causes imidazole groups to become more basic, and - conversely - the acid form of imidazole groups weakens the binding of to O_{2} Hb.

==== Ionic dissociation of CO_{2} buffering ====
When dissolved in water, CO_{2} is subject to the following dynamic chemical equilibrium:

CO_{2} + H_{2}O ⇌ H_{2}CO_{3} ⇌ H^{+} + HCO^{−}_{3}

CO_{2} is normally slow to combine with water to form carbonic acid whereas carbonic acid immediately dissociates into H^{+} and HCO^{−}_{3}. However, erythrocytes contain the enzyme carbonic anhydrase which catalyses the formation of carbonic acid. HCO^{−}_{3} is actively transported out of the cell in exchange for Cl^{-} anions to maintain electroneutrality of the cell (chloride shift), whereas H^{+} is retained within the cell and binds to deoxygenated Hb. In accordance with Le Chatelier's principle, clearance of the right-side products of the above chemical equilibrium will permits further formation of these products. In fact, the maximum catalytic rate of carbonic anhydrase is so rapid that its effectively limited by the speed with which buffers clear H^{+} from the vicinity of the enzyme.

Upon oxygenation of Hb in the lungs, its acidity increases, releasing H^{+} which recombines with HCO^{−}_{3} to restitute gaseous CO_{2} which can diffuse from the blood into the alveoli.

CO_{2} also increases the osmolar content of the erythrocyte so that erythrocytes in deoxygenated blood are in fact somewhat greater in volume.

== Clinical significance ==
In patients with lung disease, lungs may not be able to increase alveolar ventilation in the face of increased amounts of dissolved CO_{2}.

This partially explains the observation that some patients with emphysema might have an increase in P_{a}CO_{2} (partial pressure of arterial dissolved carbon dioxide) following administration of supplemental oxygen even if content of CO_{2} stays equal.

== See also ==
- Bohr effect
- Chloride shift
