= Carbamino =

Adduct formed by the addition of CO_{2} to the amine of an amino acid

Carbamino refers to an adduct generated by the addition of carbon dioxide to the free amino group of an amino acid or a protein, such as hemoglobin forming carbaminohemoglobin.

== Determining quantity of carboamino in products ==
It is possible to determine how much carbamino is formed through the techniques of electron ionization and mass spectrometry. In determining the amount of product by mass spectrometry, a careful set of instructions are followed which allows for the carbamino adducts to be transferred to a vacuum for mass spectrometry. With the separation of the carbamino adducts in the ion sampling process, it should be that the pH does not change. Hence, mass spectrometry and electron ionization are a way to measure how much carbamino adduct there is in comparison to concentration of peptide in a solution.

== Formation of sugar-carbamino ==
The sugar-carbamino is formed through a C-glycosidic linkage with the amino acid side chain via various linkers. The synthesis involves introducing annulation to appropriate amino acid residues to rigidify glycopeptides, followed by Diels-Alder cycloadditions to fuse cyclic α- and β-amino acids to the sugar moiety. This also involves the preparation of fused bicyclic C-glycosyl α-amino acid 4, which is confirmed through 2D NMR experiments, particularly NOESY. The approach to conformationally constrained (annulated)-C-glycosyl α- and β-amino acids is based upon the Diels-Alder reaction of pyranose dienes with α- and β-nitro acrylic esters.

== Carbamino compounds in blood ==
The concentration of carbamate (HbCO_{2}) was estimated in oxygenated and deoxygenated red blood cells of adult and fetal humans. The estimation was carried out at a constant pressure of carbon dioxide (PCO_{2} = 40 mm Hg) and varied pH levels of the serum. The bicarbonate concentration in the red cells was calculated using the Donnan ratio for chloride and bicarbonate ions. Based on this figure, the carbamate concentration was determined by subtracting the bicarbonate concentration and dissolved CO_{2} from the total CO_{2} concentration.

Deoxygenated fetal red cells contain more HbCO_{2} than deoxygenated adult red cells at a given pH value in the red cell. Upon oxygenation, HbCO_{2} decreased in both types of erythrocytes to values lower than in deoxygenated cells, at a constant pH. The fraction of 'oxylabile carbamate' (-ΔHbCO_{2}/ΔHbO_{2}) at a red cell pH of 7·2 and a PCO_{2} of 40 mm Hg is 0·117 in fetal and 0·081 in adult erythrocytes.

The apparent carbamate equilibrium constants (K'c and K'z) were calculated from the fraction of moles carbamate formed per Hb monomer (moles CO_{2}/mole Hbi). These constants can be used to estimate the carbamate concentration in normal adult and fetal blood.

In adult red cells, the first apparent dissociation constant of carbonic acid is significantly higher in oxygenated (-log10K'1 = pK'1 = 6·10) than in deoxygenated (pK'1 = 6·12) red cells, whereas in fetal red cells, the difference is smaller and statistically not significant.

Using the present results, the fractional contribution of carbamino compounds of hemoglobin to the amount of carbon dioxide exchanged during the respiratory cycle was computed for a given set of physiological conditions in arterial and mixed venous blood. The computed value was found to be 10·5% in adult and 19% in fetal blood.

== See also ==
- Amine gas treating
- Ionic liquids in carbon capture
