= Oxidoreductase NAD-binding domain =

Identifiers
- Symbol: NAD_binding_1
- Pfam: PF00175
- InterPro: IPR001433
- SCOP2: 2cnd / SCOPe / SUPFAM
- TCDB: 3.D.5
- CDD: cd00322
Available protein structures:
- Pfam: structures / ECOD
- PDB: RCSB PDB; PDBe; PDBj
- PDBsum: structure summary
- PDB: 1ep1B:114-208 1ep3B:114-208 1ep2B:114-208 1krhB:224-328 1ndh :147-256 1m91A:176-285 1umkA:176-285 1i7pA:176-285 1ib0A:176-285 1qx4B:176-285 1cnf :491-604 2cnd :491-604 1cne :491-604 2pia :116-211 1gvhA:263-373 1cqxA:270-379 2bf4B:537-656 2bn4A:537-656 1ja1A:529-642 1ja0A:529-642 1j9zA:529-642 1amoA:529-642 1ddiA:456-564 1ddgA:456-564 1f20A:1245-1360 1tllB:1245-1360 1jb9A:180-296 1go2A:288-409 1gr1A:288-409 1h85A:288-409 1e63A:288-409 1bqeA:288-409 1ogjA:288-409 1e64A:288-409 1ewyB:288-409 1w35A:288-409 1que :288-409 1w34A:288-409 1h42A:288-409 1gjrA:288-409 1e62A:288-409 1w87B:288-409 1qgzA:288-409 1qh0A:288-409 1bjk :288-409 2bsaA:288-409 1qgyA:288-409 1quf :288-409 1b2rA:288-409 1gawB:207-324 1gaqA:207-324 1bx1A:221-338 1frqA:221-338 1fnb :221-338 1fnc :221-338 1fnd :221-338 1bx0A:221-338 1frn :221-338 1qfzA:212-329 1qgaA:212-329 1qfyA:212-329 1qg0A:212-329 1sm4B:214-331 1fdrA:110-223 1a8p :111-230 2bgiA:124-243 2bgjB:124-243

Oxidoreductase NAD-binding domain is an evolutionary conserved protein domain present in a variety of proteins that include, bacterial flavohemoprotein, mammalian NADH-cytochrome b5 reductase, eukaryotic NADPH-cytochrome P450 reductase, nitrate reductase from plants, nitric-oxide synthase, bacterial vanillate demethylase and others.

Xanthine dehydrogenases, that also bind FAD/NAD, have essentially no similarity.

Bacterial ferredoxin-NADP^{+} reductase may be bound to the thylakoid membrane or anchored to the thylakoid-bound phycobilisomes. Chloroplast ferredoxin-NADP^{+} reductase (EC 1.18.1.2) may play a key role in regulating the relative amounts of cyclic and non-cyclic electron flow to meet the demands of the plant for ATP and reducing power. It is involved in the final step in the linear photosynthetic electron transport chain and has also been implicated in cyclic electron flow around photosystem I where its role would be to return electrons from ferredoxin to the cytochrome B-F complex.

== Examples ==
Human genes encoding proteins containing this domain include:

- CYB5R1; CYB5R2; CYB5R4; MTRR;
- NDOR1; NOS1; NOS2A; NOS3;
- OXNAD1; POR;
