= Cytochrome b5 reductase =

Class of enzymes

cytochrome-b5 reductase
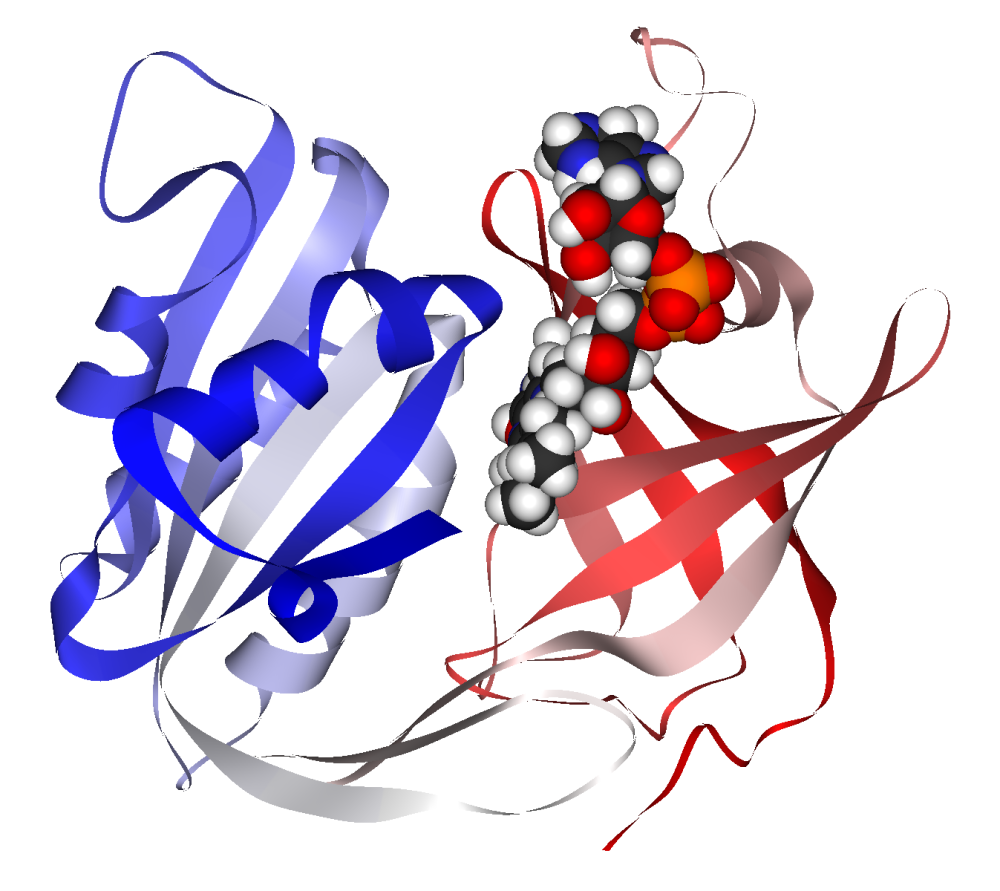
- Ribbon diagram of erythrocytic methemoglobin reductase with FAD bound. From PDB: 1UMK.

Identifiers
- EC no.: 1.6.2.2
- CAS no.: 9032-25-1

Databases
- BRENDA: enzyme data
- ExPASy: NiceZyme view
- KEGG: enzyme entry
- MetaCyc: metabolic pathway
- Rhea: reactions
- PDB structures: RCSB PDB PDBe PDBsum
- Gene Ontology: AmiGO / QuickGO
Search
- PMC: articles
- PubMed: articles
- NCBI: proteins

Cytochrome-b_{5} reductase is a NADH-dependent enzyme that converts ferricytochrome from a Fe3+ form to a Fe2+ form. It contains FAD and catalyzes the reaction:

NADH + H^{+} + 2 ferricytochrome b_{5} = NAD^{+} + 2 ferrocytochrome b_{5}

In its b5-reducing capacity, this enzyme is involved in desaturation and elongation of fatty acids, cholesterol biosynthesis, and drug metabolism. This enzyme can also reduce methemoglobin to normal hemoglobin, gaining it the inaccurate synonym methemoglobin reductase. Isoforms expressed in erythrocytes (CYB5R1, CYB5R3) perform this function in vivo. Ferricyanide is another substrate in vitro.

== Introduction ==
Cytochrome b5 reductase (c5br) is a NADH-dependent enzyme known as a flavoprotein that results in the chemical reduction to two different isoforms, a soluble form and a membrane-bound form. This enzyme is involved in the transfer of reducing equivalents from NADH due to the FAD electron acceptor in cytochrome b5, located in complex III of the electron transport chain, which results in the two isoforms due to alternative splicing. The overall reduction reaction from cytochrome b5 reductase aids in the control of iron in red blood cells, which dictates the amount of oxygen cells carry.

Cytochromes are redox proteins that are essential for energy transfer in the electron transport chain with the help of an enzyme such as a reductase. Cytochromes are categorized into three classes (a, b, and c) in accordance with the type of heme that is present in the core and their light-absorption spectra.

The specialized protein cytochrome b5 is a class B cytochrome with a high and low potential heme b attached to the central iron on the protein. The cytochrome b class is especially unique because it is attached to proteins within the inner mitochondrial membrane instead of on the outer portion, and this particular class has high sequence variation. With the ability to express approximately 1080 base pairs, cytochrome b proteins are commonly studied to analyze mitochondrial DNA and determine phylogenetic relationships across evolution.

Cytochrome reductase enzymes are therefore an essential component of the electron transport chain that carry out the function of cytochrome proteins and activate their reactions. Cytochrome b5 reductase successfully catalyzes the electron transfer of reducing equivalents to then activate cytochrome b for it to carry out its role in organisms.

== Structure ==
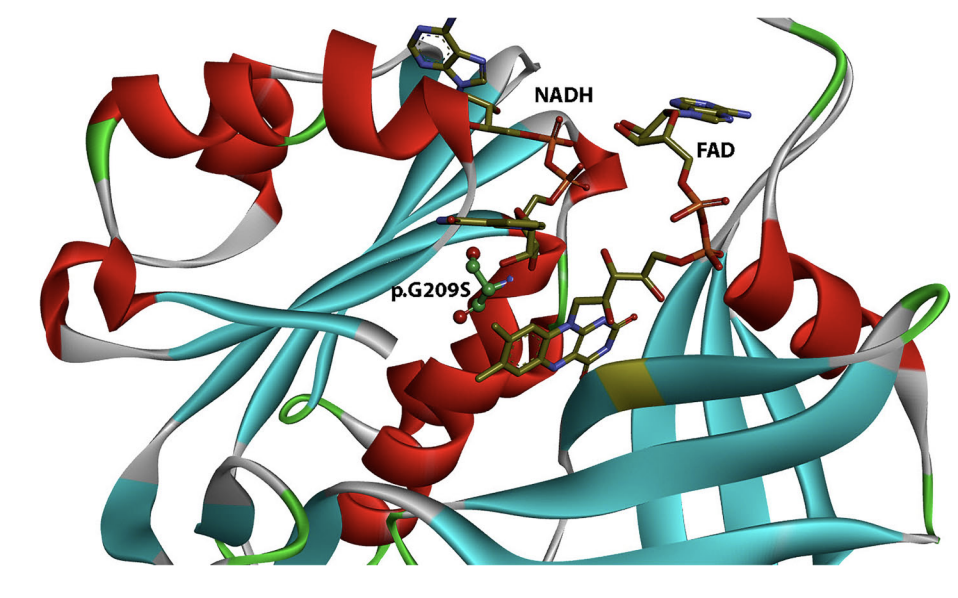
3-D structure of a cytochrome b5 reductase model with a ribon display and enzyme cofactor domains for NADH and FAD. The image was produced using BIOVIA Discovery Studio Visualizer, collected for the Journal of Veterinary Internal Medicine.

The cytochrome b5 reductase enzyme contains a typical oxidoreductase structure with a diaphorase binding domain complex for NADH and a FAD-binding domain. A three-stranded linker domain is present, as well as water-mediated hydrogen bonds, in order to biochemically connect the complex. Once cytochrome b5 reductase catalyzes electron transfer, the resulting reduced form of cytochrome b5 reduces the oxidized ferric ion of hemoglobin from Fe 3+ to Fe 2+.

Mechanism: NADH + H^{+} + 2 ferricytochrome b5 -> NAD^{+} + 2 ferrocytochrome b5

== Function ==
The features of cytochrome b5 reductase enzymes allow the successful reduction of molecules of cytochrome b5 to be used for various functions across the electron transport chain and metabolism. In metabolism, c5br is active in lipid conversion involving the elongation and desaturation of fatty acids and cholesterol biosynthesis.

Specialized isoforms of the enzyme c5br are heavily functional in the blood to help deliver oxygen to the body's tissue by conformationally changing methemoglobin to hemoglobin. Other isoforms are useful in chemical reactions throughout the body, with assistance in the breakdown of various substances.

=== Reduction of methemoglobin to hemoglobin ===
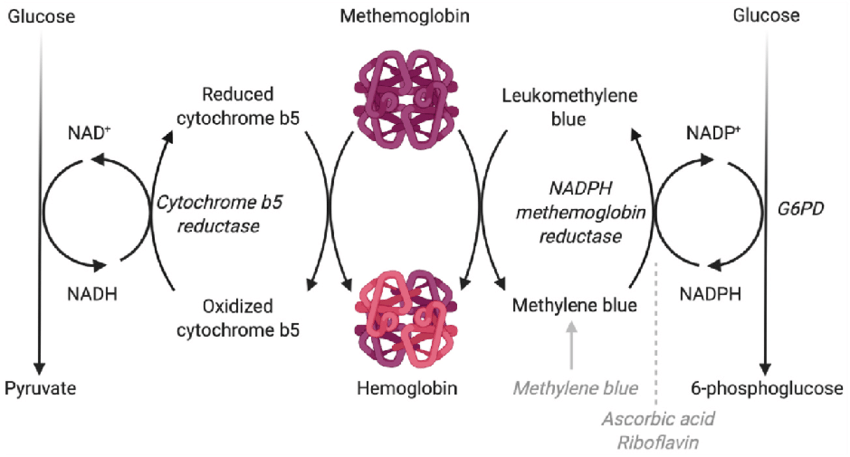
Oxidation and reduction pathways of methemoglobin and hemoglobin. Published by N. De Crem et al., 2022.

In living organisms, because methemoglobin (MetHb) is unable to bind oxygen, it must be reduced to hemoglobin (Hb) through the action of the soluble isoform of cytochrome b5 reductase. Overall, the mechanics of this reaction include electron transfer through oxidation steps, which can be accomplished through a couple of different mechanisms involving the reduction of pyridine nucleotides. One mechanism, which is also the most naturally present pathway, involves electron transfer catalyzed by cytochrome b5 reductase through the oxidation of NADH to NAD+. The electron donor, NADH, that supports this reaction is a product of glucose oxidation from glycolysis. The reduction reaction converts the oxidized methemoglobin to the reduced hemoglobin form, that now has an affinity for oxygen. Another mechanism involves the conversion of the reduced pyridine nucleotide triphosphopyridine nucleotide (TPNH) to methylene blue, which is induced by the electron transfer in the oxidation of NADPH to NADP+ by NAPHD methemoglobin reductase. TPNH is the most favorable pyridine nucleotide to reduce methemoglobin; however, other cofactors can be used, including leukomethylene blue. Additional reduced nucleotide pyridines can also catalyze the oxidation of hemoglobin to methemoglobin. For example, in the reverse reaction of NAPHD methemoglobin reductase, methylene blue can be used to catalyze the oxidation of hemoglobin to methemoglobin. Other enzymes, including diaphorase enzymes, can convert reduced diphosphopyridine nucleotide (DPNH) from glyceraldehyde-3-phosphate in order to replenish methemoglobin levels in the cell.

== Isoforms ==
=== Membrane-bound ===
The membrane-bound isoform of cytochrome b5 reductase is found in all cell types and is not limited to red blood cells. It is typically found embedded in the membranes of various cellular compartments, with a domain inserted into the lipid bilayer on the outer leaflet of the endoplasmic reticulum. This specific isoform is made up of approximately 300 amino acid residues with an N-terminal tail of 24 residues that anchors the protein to the membrane. There is a subsequent soluble domain that is part of this isoform that attaches to the cytosol. Due to its structure and location, the membrane-bound isoform of c5br is essential for biological functions within organisms. By possessing a membrane binding domain and a water-soluble domain, this isoform is able to carry out chemical and redox reactions for the electron transport chain and is functional in the formation of fatty acids, the formation of cholesterol, and the breakdown of molecules and drugs.

=== Soluble ===
The soluble isoform of cytochrome b5 reductase is found only present in red blood cells. On erythrocytes, red blood cells, the c5br enzyme is responsible for the recycling and conversion of methemoglobin to hemoglobin. Methemoglobin is an oxidized form of hemoglobin attached to a ferric-state iron (Fe3+), which can therefore not carry and deliver oxygen to tissues. The formation of methemoglobin occurs when electrons are not returned to the iron of a normal state hemoglobin, which is not preferred for a functioning organism. Methemoglobin is not favorable for a functional organism since oxygen needs to constantly be transferred; therefore, the soluble isoform of c5br is essential to keep levels of methemoglobin low in humans.

=== Genes ===
- CYB5R1, NADH-cytochrome b5 reductase 1, located on chromosome 1q32.1 with 9 exons that encode for c5br.
- CYB5R2, NADH-cytochrome b5 reductase 2, located on chromosome 11p15.4 with 12 exons that encode for c5br.
- CYB5R3, NADH-cytochrome b5 reductase 3, located on chromosome 22q13.2 with 12 exons that encode for c5br.
- CYB5R4, NADH-cytochrome b5 reductase 4, located on chromosome 6q14.2 with 16 exons that encode for c5br.

== Clinical significance ==
=== Mutations ===
Mutations in cytochrome b5 reductase can lead to many disorders, including autosomal recessive congenital methemoglobinemia. There are over 65 mutations of the enzyme that can lead to various types of the disorder. Some include:

Type I methemoglobinemia (MHb)
mutation where the NADH cytochrome b5 reductase enzyme is deficient only in the red blood cells. The lack of this enzyme results in the inability to conformationally change ferric iron to ferrous iron, which leads to an increase in methemoglobin in the cells and a decrease in hemoglobin. The decrease in available hemoglobin results in reduced amounts of oxygen across the body. Due to the lack of oxygen that can be carried by the RBCs, symptoms include a bluish appearance of the skin, lips, and nails (cyanosis). This is the most common variation of a c5br mutation. The type I variation of methemoglobinemia is the first category out of two congenital, autosomal recessive disorders resulting from mutations of the c5br gene. While this is the most common mutation, the symptoms are less severe, and life expectancy is, for the most part, unaffected.
Type II MHb
mutation where the NADH cytochrome b5 reductase enzyme is deficient in various tissues besides RBCs. This mutation typically results in the complete loss of cytochrome b5 reductase activity throughout the body, which ultimately leads to an even bigger increase in methemoglobin levels within red blood cells. With even lower levels of hemoglobin present in the body, oxygen is not able to be properly carried, which results in even more detrimental symptoms, including neurological problems and impaired biosynthesis. Effected biosynthesis in organisms can be seen by impaired fatty acid formation, which reduces the production of myelin in nerve cells. Defected nerve cells lead to a loss of motor function and movement disorders, which are highly associated with Type II MHb. The type II variation of methemoglobinemia is the second, and more severe category of congenital disorders resulting from mutations in the c5br gene. However, it was found that the mutation is specific and more prominent in specific populations, including Athabasca, Navajo, and Yakutsk native populations across the world.
Type III MHb
mutation where NADH cytochrome b5 reductase enzyme deficiency has an effect on all blood cells, including white blood cells and platelets in addition to red blood cells. Characteristic symptoms with this mutation are only found to be common cyanosis due to lack of oxygen.
Type IV MHb
mutation where the NADH cytochrome b5 reductase enzyme is deficient only in the red blood cells, similar to the type I MHb deficiency. Mechanisms and reactions are also similar to a type I mutation, but variants of this mutation can subsequently develop into chronic cyanosis.

=== Treatments ===
Most cases of methemoglobinemia are treatable and not chronic. The most common and successful treatment used to treat patients with high levels of methemoglobinemia is the antidote methylene blue. Methylene blue is already recognized as a product of the reversible reaction fueled by NAPHD methemoglobin reductase, catalyzed by leukcomethylene, to reduce methemoglobin to hemoglobin. Therefore, when methemoglobin levels are high in a patient, additional methylene blue can be introduced to be reduced to leukcomethylene to now catalyze the reduction of excess methemoglobin to hemoglobin. While the addition of methylene blue to treat cases of methemoglobinemia has been scientifically tested and proven, there are some side effects to note and monitor with high dosages of the antidote. Minor side effects include green or blue discoloration of urine; however, significant side effects include worsening of the present methemoglobinemia. Because methylene blue is an oxidizing agent itself, when it is not effectively reduced, NADPH will not be properly restored in the cell for electron transfer, resulting in increased levels of non reduced methemoglobin to support methemoglobinemia in patients. Additional studies have found that the use of methylene blue during pregnancy is associated with a high risk of small intestinal atresia, which can be fatal to the fetus.

It is recommended that treatment with methylene blue requires two doses before being deemed ineffective. If symptoms of methemoglobinemia are still present after the second dosage, alternative treatments, including ascorbic acid, exchange transfusion, and hyperbaric oxygen therapy, can be considered. However, no additional antidote has been tested and confirmed to the extent of methylene blue, and in most cases, additional antidotes are generally ineffective. It is also noted that high doses of ascorbic acid are associated with increased urinary excretion of oxalate and renal failure.

== Research ==
Cytochrome b5 reductase is a prevalent topic in research and clinical tests to understand the additional functions of the enzyme in other metabolic pathways in the body. Mice and flies are common model organisms used to test for the relationship of cytochrome b5 reductase with the overall health of living organisms.

A recent study from 2023 used mice as a model to test the extended effects of c5br on oxygen supply in the presence of additional oxidative stress, such as from sickle cell disease or ischemic stroke. The results showed that c5br not only increases oxygen supply and transport in a wild-type organism but also regulates the erythropoietin response to ischemic stroke. These findings have made cytochrome b5 reductase a target for future research on managing stroke risk and providing selective advantage for those with genetic disorders such as sickle cell disease.

Another study with mice as well as flies tested the physiological role of cytochrome b5 reductase on lipid metabolism, health, and aging. By activating the cb5r-expressing gene in both model organisms, it was observed that lifespan and lipid metabolism were positively affected. In the model flies, the drug tetrahydroindenoindole was used to activate cytochrome b5 reductase activity, and observations concluded that the increased function of cb5r extended the fly's lifespan. The increased expression of cytochrome b5 reductase in mice resulted in high levels of long-chain polyunsaturated fatty acids, improved mitochondrial function, and a decrease in oxidative damage, indicating improved metabolic pathways with high levels of cb5r activity. These results indicate that cytochrome b5 reductase is a new target for new research and development of lipid metabolism and health in living organisms.
