= Oxidoreductase FAD-binding domain =

Identifiers
- Symbol: FAD_binding_6
- Pfam: PF00970
- InterPro: IPR008333
- SCOP2: 1cne / SCOPe / SUPFAM
- CDD: cd00322
Available protein structures:
- Pfam: structures / ECOD
- PDB: RCSB PDB; PDBe; PDBj
- PDBsum: structure summary
- PDB: 1ep1B:7-104 1ep3B:7-104 1ep2B:7-104 1cqxA:156-261 1gvhA:154-253 1krhB:120-215 2pia :11-108 2bgiA:18-114 2bgjB:18-114 1a8p :6-101 1fdrA:6-92 1cnf :365-472 2cnd :365-472 1cne :365-472 1m91A:44-151 1umkA:44-151 1ndh :15-122 1i7pA:44-151 1ib0A:44-151 1qx4B:44-151

The oxidoreductase FAD-binding domain is an evolutionary conserved protein domain. To date, the 3D-structures of the flavoprotein domain of Zea mays nitrate reductase and of pig NADH:cytochrome b5 reductase have been solved. The overall fold is similar to that of ferredoxin:NADP^{+} reductase: the FAD-binding domain (N-terminal) has the topology of an anti-parallel beta-barrel, while the NAD(P)-binding domain (C-terminal) has the topology of a classical pyridine dinucleotide-binding fold (i.e. a central parallel beta-sheet flanked by 2 helices on each side).

== Examples ==
Human genes encoding proteins containing this domain include:

- CYB5R1; CYB5R2; CYB5R4; CYB5RL;
