= Nitric oxide dioxygenase =

nitric oxide dioxygenase
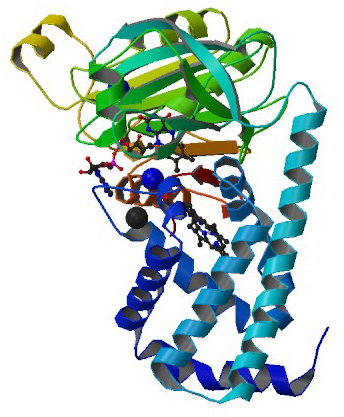
- E. coli flavohemoglobin/NOD structure. green = reductase domain, blue = hemoglobin domain.

Identifiers
- EC no.: 1.14.12.17
- CAS no.: 214466-78-1

Databases
- IntEnz: IntEnz view
- BRENDA: BRENDA entry
- ExPASy: NiceZyme view
- KEGG: KEGG entry
- MetaCyc: metabolic pathway
- PRIAM: profile
- PDB structures: RCSB PDB PDBe PDBsum
- Gene Ontology: AmiGO / QuickGO
Search
- PMC: articles
- PubMed: articles
- NCBI: proteins

Nitric oxide dioxygenase (EC 1.14.12.17) is an enzyme that catalyzes the conversion of nitric oxide (NO) to nitrate (NO^{−}_{3}) . The net reaction for the reaction catalyzed by nitric oxide dioxygenase is shown below:

- 2NO + 2O_{2} + NAD(P)H → 2NO_{3}^{−} + NAD(P)^{+} + H^{+}

Nitric oxide is a ubiquitous small molecule that is integrated in a wide variety of physiological processes including smooth muscle vasodilation, platelet disaggregation, neurotransmission, and immune response to bacterial infection. Overproduction of this signaling molecule can be lethal to cells by poisoning cellular energy production. The most sensitive targets of NO are aconitase, an enzyme that catalyzes the isomerization of citrate to isocitrate in the citric acid cycle, and cytochrome oxidase, the last enzyme in the respiratory electron transport chain of mitochondria. Additionally NO, with its lone radical on the nitrogen atom, is implicated in a number of secondary mechanisms of toxicity, including catalase inhibition (resulting in hydrogen peroxide toxicity), Fe-S center iron liberation, and the formation of dinitosyl-iron complexes.

Due to the potential lethality of NO, cells benefitted greatly from the evolution of an enzyme capable of catalyzing the conversion of toxic NO to nitrate. A 'nitric oxide dioxygenase' is an enzyme that is capable of carrying out this reaction. NO dioxygenase belongs to the family of oxidoreductases, more specifically those acting on paired donors, with O_{2} as oxidant and with incorporation of two atoms of oxygen into the other donor.

== Reaction mechanism ==
The mechanism of action has still not been entirely deduced, however, the leading theory suggests that the conversion is carried out through a series of redox reactions involving iron centers as shown in the series of half reactions below:

Step	Reaction
FAD reduction	NAD(P)H + FAD + H^{+} → NAD(P)^{+} + FADH_{2}
Iron reduction 1	FADH_{2} + Fe^{3+} → Fe^{2+} + FADH + H^{+}
Iron Reduction 2	FADH + Fe^{3+} → FAD + Fe^{2+} + H^{+}
O_{2} Binding	Fe^{2+} + O_{2} → Fe^{3+}(O_{2}^{−})
NO dioxygenation	Fe^{3+}(O_{2}^{−}) + NO → Fe^{3+} + NO_{3}^{−}

Another theory developed more recently (2009) suggests that a NO dioxygenase activity could also proceed through phenolic nitration via a putative heme-peroxynitrite intermediate.

The most well studied NO dioxygenase is flavohemoglobin (flavoHb), shown to the right: Studies have shown that flavohemoglobins are induced by NO, nitrite, nitrate, and NO-releasing agents in various bacteria and fungi. Additionally, flavoHbs have been shown to protect bacteria, yeast, and Dictyostelium discoideum against growth inhibition and damage mediated via NO.

== Discovery ==
Nitric oxide dioxygenase was discovered, and first reported in 1998, as an inducible O_{2}-dependent enzymatic activity that protected bacteria against nitric oxide toxicity. The enzyme was identified with the E. coli flavohemoglobin.

More recently, another protein has been identified as a NO dioxygenase - rhodobacter sphaeroides haem protein (SHP), a novel cytochrome with NO dioxygenase activity. Although the biological function of SHP has yet to be identified, SHP has been shown, that with oxygen bound, it can react rapidly with nitric oxide to form nitrate.

== Structure and molecular function ==
The flavohemoglobin protein contains two domains: an oxidoreductase FAD-binding domain, and a b-type heme-containing "globin" domain and optionally an oxidoreductase NAD-binding domain. The reductase domain supplies an electron to the heme iron to achieve a high rate of catalytic NO dioxygenation. In addition to numerous flavohemoglobins, many distantly related members of the hemoglobin superfamily including the muscle myoglobin, the non-symbiotic plant hemoglobin and symbiotic plant leghemoglobin, the neuronal neuroglobin, and the mammalian cytoplasmic cytoglobin appear to function as nitric oxide dioxygenases (NODs), although the cellular electron donor(s) for many globins have yet to be defined. Electron donors may include ascorbate, cytochrome b_{5} or ferredoxin reductase. The catalytic NO dioxygenation can be written in its simplest form:

NO + O_{2} + e^{−} $\rightleftharpoons$ NO_{3}^{−}

Catalysis is very efficient. The reported bimolecular NO dioxygenation rate constants range from 2 × 10^{7} M^{−1}s^{−1} for cytoglobin to 3 × 10^{9} M^{−1}s^{−1} for flavohemoglobin, and turnover rates range from 1 to 700 s^{−1}. Structure, O_{2} binding, and reduction of globins appear optimized for a NO dioxygenase function.

== Physiological function ==
Historically, nitric oxide dioxygenase (around 1.8 billion years ago) served to provide the modern day analogue of hemoglobin/myoglobin function for oxygen storage and transport. Gardner et al. (1998) suggested that the first hemoglobin/myoglobin probably functioned as an enzyme utilizing bound ‘activated’ oxygen gas to dioxygenate NO in microbes.

The wide diversity of multicellular organisms benefitting from the oxygen storage and transport functions of myoglobin/hemoglobin appeared much later (approximately 0.5 billion years ago).

NODs are now known to serve two important physiological functions in diverse life forms: they prevent NO toxicity (otherwise known as "nitrosative stress") and regulate NO signalling. NODs belong to the larger family of well-established free radical and reactive oxygen detoxifying enzymes that includes superoxide dismutase, catalase, and peroxidase.

== Distribution in nature ==
NODs, as well as many hemoglobins that function as NODs, are distributed to most life forms including bacteria, fungi, protists, worms, plants and animals. In fact, nitric oxide dioxygenation appears to be a primal function for members of the hemoglobin superfamily. Moreover, it is becoming increasingly evident that the NOD function of globins is much more common than the paradigmatic O_{2} transport-storage function of red cell hemoglobin which was first investigated and reported over a century earlier by Felix Hoppe-Seyler and others. Other proteins that may act as NODs include mammalian microsomal cytochrome P450(s) and a novel O_{2}-binding cytochrome b from Rhodobacter sphaeroides.

== Technologies ==
Inhibitors of the NODs are being developed for application as microbial antibiotics, anti-tumor agents and modulators of NO signalling. The most prominent class of inhibitor of NO dioxygenase to date is imidazole antibiotics. Imidazoles have been shown to coordinate with the heme iron atom of microbial flavohemoglobin, impair ferric heme reduction, produce uncompetitive inhibition with respect to O_{2} and NO, and inhibit NO metabolism by yeasts and bacteria. Specifically, imidazoles bearing bulky aromatic substituents have been shown to have potential for selective and high-affinity inhibition of NO dioxygenase function by coordinating the catalytic heme iron and "fitting" within the large hydrophobic distal heme pocket. As a result, imidazole engineering has been suggested as a means to specifically inhibit NO dioxygenases.

In addition, genetically modified plants with heterologous flavohemoglobin-NODs are being developed to limit NO toxicity created by metabolism of nitrogen fertilizers by soil microbes and as a means towards plant self-fertilization through absorption of environmental NO.

Recently a lentiviral vector that allows for expression of E. coli flavoHb in mammalian cells has been described. This approach demonstrated that flavoHb is indeed enzymatically active within human and murine cells and potently blocks exogenous and endogenous sources of nitrosative stress. This technology was then extended to interrogate the role of NO synthesis in the highly tumorigenic cancer stem cells (CSCs) from human glioblastoma (brain tumor) samples. Expression of flavoHb within xenografted tumors led to depletion of NO generated by iNOS/NOS2. The phenotypic result was loss of tumorigenicity of the CSCs and improved mouse survival. These experiments demonstrate that flavoHb can be employed for in vivo studies of nitric oxide biology and suggest that therapeutic NO-depletion may be achieved via heterologous expression of bacterial flavoHbs.
