= Flavoprotein pyridine nucleotide cytochrome reductases =

FAD binding domain

Identifiers
- Symbol: FAD_binding_1
- Pfam: PF00667
- InterPro: IPR003097
- SCOP2: 1amo / SCOPe / SUPFAM
Available protein structures:
- PDB: 1ddiA:229-424 1ddgA:229-424 1f20A:985-1214 1tllB:985-1214 1ja1A:274-493 1ja0A:274-493 1j9zA:274-493 1amoA:274-493 2bf4B:261-481 2bn4A:261-481 IPR003097 PF00667 (ECOD; PDBsum)
- AlphaFold: IPR003097; PF00667

Flavoprotein pyridine nucleotide cytochrome reductases catalyse the interchange of reducing equivalents between one-electron carriers and the two-electron-carrying nicotinamide dinucleotides. The enzymes include ferredoxin-NADP+ reductases, plant and fungal NAD(P)H:nitrate reductases, cytochrome b5 reductases, cytochrome P450 reductases, sulphite reductases, nitric oxide synthases, phthalate dioxygenase reductase, and various other flavoproteins.

== Human proteins containing this domain ==
MTRR; NDOR1; NOS1; NOS2A; NOS3; NR1; POR;
