= MTRR =

MTRR may refer to:

- 5-methyltetrahydrofolate-homocysteine methyltransferase reductase, a human gene
- Memory Type Range Registers, in computer hardware
