= Mitoregulin =

Protein found in humans

MTLN

Identifiers
- Aliases: MTLN, NCRNA00116, long intergenic non-protein coding RNA 116, LINC00116, Mitoregulin
- External IDs: GeneCards: MTLN
Orthologs
Databases	NCBI: entry; OMA: entry
Species	Human	Mouse
Entrez	205251	n/a
Ensembl	ENSG00000175701	n/a
UniProt	Q8NCU8	n/a
RefSeq (mRNA)	NM_001384134	n/a
RefSeq (protein)	NP_001371063	n/a
Location (UCSC)	n/a	n/a
PubMed search		n/a
- Wikidata
View/Edit Human

Mitoregulin is a protein that in humans is encoded by the MTLN gene. This protein regulates fatty acid metabolism in the mitochondria, especially in muscles. The gene MTLN was originally thought to only encode a long non-coding RNA (Linc RNA), and so was previously designated LINC00116. However, like a number of similar genes, it was found to contain the transcript for a (56 amino acid) micropeptide.

== Function ==
This protein is highly expressed in the muscles, and has the effect of increasing mitochondrial membrane potential and the mitochondrial respiration rate, which promotes cell differentiation into muscle cells.

It is located in either the inner or outer mitochondrial membrane, with different authors disagreeing. It plays a major role in regulating fatty acid metabolism through its interaction with proteins like CYB5B, though the identity of many of its other interacting partners remain a source of disagreement across papers.

The lincRNA transcript, LINC00116, may also act as an inhibitor of p53 independently of the protein mitoregulin.
