= Diaphorase =

Diaphorase may refer to:

- Cytochrome b5 reductase, an enzyme
- NADH dehydrogenase, an enzyme
- NADPH dehydrogenase, an enzyme

== See also ==
- NADPH-diaphorase (disambiguation)
