= CMP-N-acetylneuraminate monooxygenase =

Class of enzymes

Identifiers
- EC no.: 1.14.18.2
- CAS no.: 116036-67-0

Databases
- IntEnz: IntEnz view
- BRENDA: BRENDA entry
- ExPASy: NiceZyme view
- KEGG: KEGG entry
- MetaCyc: metabolic pathway
- PRIAM: profile
- PDB structures: RCSB PDB PDBe PDBsum
- Gene Ontology: AmiGO / QuickGO
Search
- PMC: articles
- PubMed: articles
- NCBI: proteins

In enzymology, a CMP-N-acetylneuraminate monooxygenase (EC 1.14.18.2) is an enzyme that catalyzes the chemical reaction

CMP-N-acetylneuraminate + 2 ferrocytochrome b_{5} + O_{2} + 2 H^{+} $\rightleftharpoons$ CMP-N-glycoloylneuraminate + 2 ferricytochrome b_{5} + H_{2}O

The 4 substrates of this enzyme are CMP-N-acetylneuraminate, ferrocytochrome b5, O_{2}, and H^{+}, whereas its 3 products are CMP-N-glycoloylneuraminate, ferricytochrome b5, and H_{2}O.

This enzyme belongs to the family of oxidoreductases, specifically those acting on paired donors, with O2 as oxidant and incorporation or reduction of oxygen. The oxygen incorporated need not be derived from O2 with another compound as one donor, and incorporation of one atom o oxygen into the other donor. The systematic name of this enzyme class is CMP-N-acetylneuraminate,ferrocytochrome-b5:oxygen oxidoreductase (N-acetyl-hydroxylating). Other names in common use include CMP-N-acetylneuraminic acid hydroxylase, CMP-Neu5Ac hydroxylase, cytidine monophosphoacetylneuraminate monooxygenase, N-acetylneuraminic monooxygenase, and cytidine-5'-monophosphate-N-acetylneuraminic acid hydroxylase. This enzyme participates in aminosugars metabolism.
