= CYB5R3 =

Protein-coding gene in the species Homo sapiens

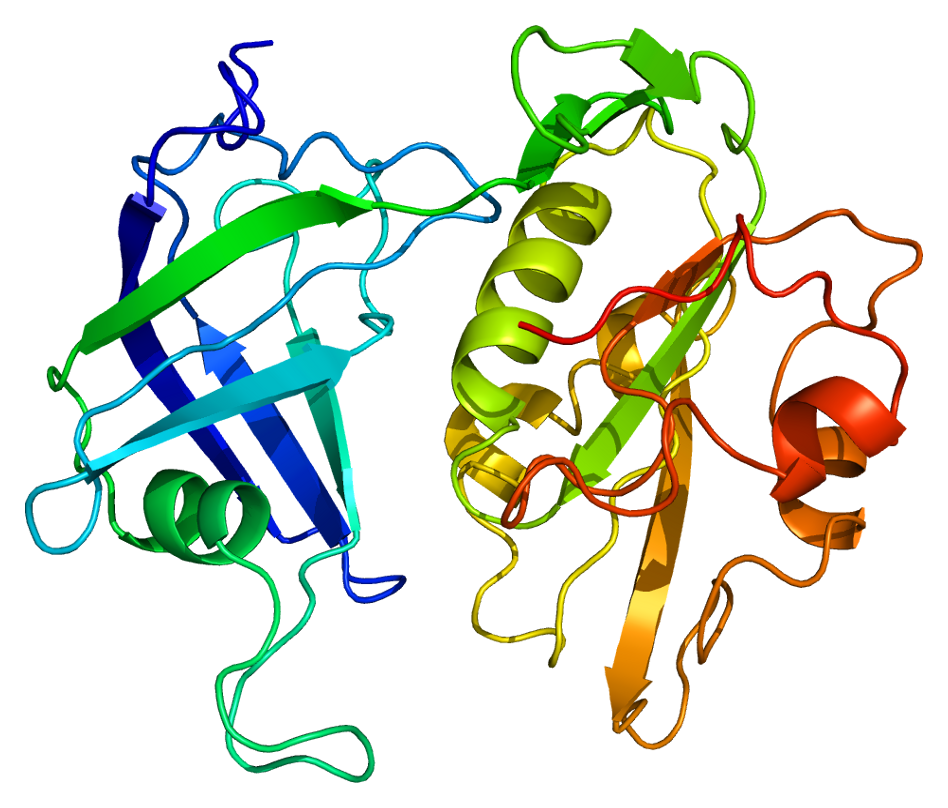

Identifiers
- Aliases: CYB5R3, B5R, DIA1, cytochrome b5 reductase 3
- External IDs: OMIM: 613213; MGI: 94893; GeneCards: CYB5R3
Available structures
PDB	Ortholog search: PDBe RCSB
PDB	List of PDB id codes 1UMK
Enzyme activity
EC #	BRENDA	ExPASy	KEGG	MetaCyc
1.6.2.2	↗	↗	↗	↗

Gene location (Human)
Chr.	Chromosome 22 (human)
Band	22q13.2	Start	42,615,730 bp
Band	22q13.2	End	42,720,870 bp

Gene location (Mouse)
Chr.	Chromosome 15 (mouse)
Band	15 E1|15 39.4 cM	Start	83,037,695 bp
Band	15 E1|15 39.4 cM	End	83,056,793 bp
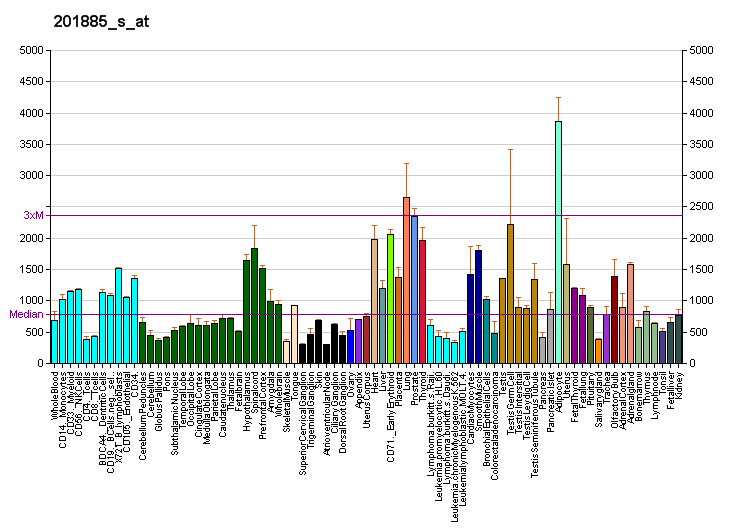
RNA expression pattern
Bgee	Human / Mouse (ortholog); Top expressed in: Descending thoracic aorta; right coronary artery; ascending aorta; saphenous vein; urethra; olfactory bulb; popliteal artery; tibial arteries; skin of hip; synovial joint / Top expressed in: ascending aorta; aortic valve; decidua; external carotid artery; saccule; internal carotid artery; tunica media of zone of aorta; skin of external ear; carotid body; otic placode; More reference expression data
BioGPS	More reference expression data
Gene ontology
Molecular function	flavin adenine dinucleotide binding; ADP binding; NAD binding; FAD binding; cytochrome-b5 reductase activity, acting on NAD(P)H; AMP binding; oxidoreductase activity; protein binding
Cellular component	cytoplasm; endoplasmic reticulum membrane; lipid droplet; mitochondrial outer membrane; hemoglobin complex; mitochondrial inner membrane; extracellular exosome; membrane; mitochondrion; endoplasmic reticulum; extracellular region; azurophil granule lumen
Biological process	steroid metabolic process; sterol biosynthetic process; lipid metabolism; cholesterol metabolic process; blood circulation; cholesterol biosynthetic process; steroid biosynthetic process; L-ascorbic acid metabolic process; xenobiotic metabolic process; neutrophil degranulation
Sources:Amigo / QuickGO
Orthologs
Databases	NCBI: entry; OMA: entry
Species	Human	Mouse
Entrez	1727	109754
Ensembl	ENSG00000100243	ENSMUSG00000018042
UniProt	P00387	Q9DCN2
RefSeq (mRNA)	NM_007326; NM_000398; NM_001129819; NM_001171660; NM_001171661	NM_029787
RefSeq (protein)	NP_000389; NP_001123291; NP_001165131; NP_001165132; NP_015565	NP_084063
Location (UCSC)	Chr 22: 42.62 – 42.72 Mb	Chr 15: 83.04 – 83.06 Mb
PubMed search
- Wikidata
View/Edit Human	View/Edit Mouse

NADH-cytochrome b5 reductase 3 is an enzyme that in humans is encoded by the CYB5R3 gene.

== Structure ==
The CYB5R3 gene is located on the 22nd chromosome, with its specific location being 22q13.2. The gene contains 12 exons. CYB5R3 encodes a 34.2 kDa protein that is composed of 301 amino acids; 63 peptides have been observed through mass spectrometry data.

The entire gene is about 31 kb in length. Exon 2 contains the junction of the membrane-binding domain and the catalytic domain of b5R, which shows that there are two forms of b5R: a soluble form and a membrane-bound form. The 5' portion of this gene does not have typical regulatory transcriptional elements, but has the sequence G-G-G-C-G-G a total of five times. The GC content of this 5' portion of the gene is 86%, much higher than the average GC of the entire gene, which is 55%. There is also an atypical polyadenylation signal in the 3'-untranslated region of the gene.

The protein encoded by the CYB5R3 gene is cytochrome b5 reductase, a flavoprotein that is produced as two different isoforms with different localizations. There is an amphipathic microsomal isoform that is found in all cell types but red blood cells; this isoform has one hydrophobic membrane-anchoring domain and one catalytic domain that is hydrophilic. The other isoform, a soluble cytochrome b5 reductase isoform, is found in human erythrocytes. This protein is truncated, and encoded by an alternative transcript that produces only the larger, hydrophilic domain. The protein contains 4 cysteine residues, Cys-203, -273, -283, and -297. Cys-283 is thought to be involved in NADH binding by chemical modification; in fact, both Cys-273 and Cys-283 are thought to be close to the NADH-binding site. The NH_{2}-terminal structure of the membrane-binding domain is CH3(CH2)12-CO-Gly-Ala-Gln-Leu-Ser-Thr-Leu-Gly-His-Met-Val-Leu-Phe-Pro-Val-Trp-Phe-Leu-Tyr-Ser-Leu-Leu-Met-Lys.

Two forms of NADH-cytochrome b5 reductase are known, a membrane-bound form in somatic cells (anchored in the endoplasmic reticulum, mitochondria and other membranes) and a soluble form in erythrocytes. The membrane-bound form has both membrane-binding and catalytic domains. The soluble form has only the catalytic domain. This gene encodes both forms of the enzyme which arise from tissue-specific alternative transcripts that differ in the first exon. Mutations in this gene cause methemoglobinemias.

== Function ==
Cytochrome b5 reductase is involved in the transfer of reducing equivalents from the physiological electron donor, NADH, via an FAD domain to the small molecules of cytochrome b5. It's also heavily involved in many oxidation and reduction reactions, such as the reduction of methemoglobin to hemoglobin. Of the two forms of NADH-cytochrome b5 reductase, the membrane-bound form exists mainly on the cytoplasmic side of the endoplasmic reticulum and functions in desaturation and elongation of fatty acids, in cholesterol biosynthesis, and in drug metabolism. The erythrocyte form is located in a soluble fraction of circulating erythrocytes and is involved in methemoglobin reduction.

== Clinical significance ==
Mutations in the CYB5R3 gene cause methemoglobinemia types I and II. This is a rare autosomal recessive disease due to a deficiency of isoform of NADH-cytochrome b5 reductase. Many mutations of this gene and the subsequent disease manifestation have been described. The disease manifests as the accumulation of oxidized Fe+3 in humans. Type I recessive congenital methemoglobinemia (RCM) is characterized by a deficiency of the soluble isoform and manifests as the cyanosis of skin and mucous membranes. In type II, the defect affects both isoforms and thus affects more general tissues such as red blood cells, leukocytes, and all body tissues. This type is associated with mental deficiency and other neurologic symptoms, which may be because the cytochrome b5 system plays a crucial role in the desaturation of fatty acids in the body. Recently, it was reported that abnormal lipid metabolism related with the desaturation of fatty acids is likely to be a secondary phenotype rather than a direct cause of the disease. The authors describe new insights on the aetiology of neurological disorders caused by CYB5R3d deficiency. One patient was described as having a new class of this disorder, type III. This condition was characterized by a deficiency of NADH cytochrome b5 reductase in lymphocytes, platelets, and erythrocytes, but this was not associated with mental retardation.

== Interactions ==
CYB5R3 is known to interact with CYB5A, ENO1, and SUMO2 among other proteins.
