= Cytochrome b5 type A =

Protein found in humans

CYB5A
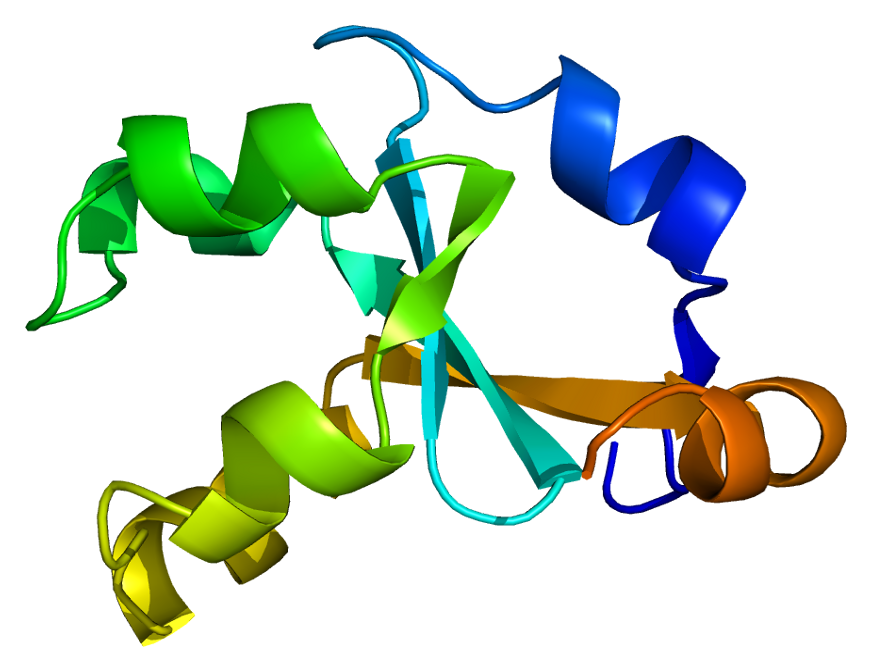

Identifiers
- Aliases: CYB5A, CYB5, MCB5, Cytochrome b5, type A, cytochrome b5 type A, METAG
- External IDs: OMIM: 613218; MGI: 1926952; GeneCards: CYB5A
Available structures
PDB	Ortholog search: PDBe RCSB
PDB	List of PDB id codes 2I96

Gene location (Human)
Chr.	Chromosome 18 (human)
Band	18q22.3	Start	74,250,846 bp
Band	18q22.3	End	74,291,973 bp

Gene location (Mouse)
Chr.	Chromosome 18 (mouse)
Band	18 E4|18 57.53 cM	Start	84,856,829 bp
Band	18 E4|18 57.53 cM	End	84,897,996 bp
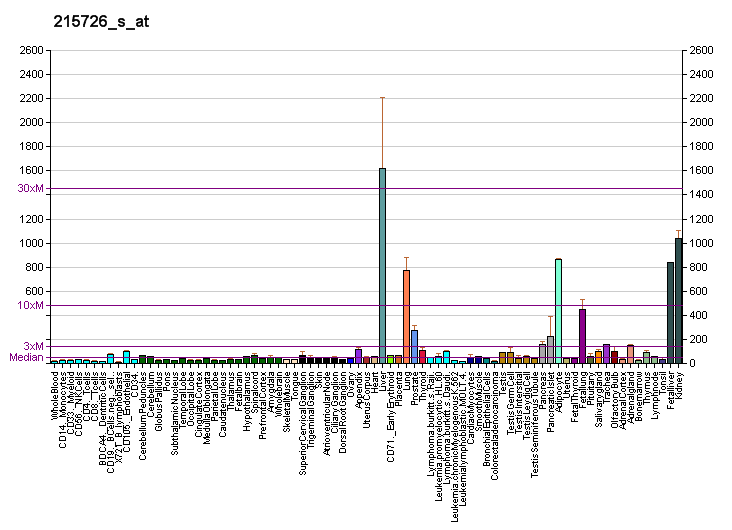

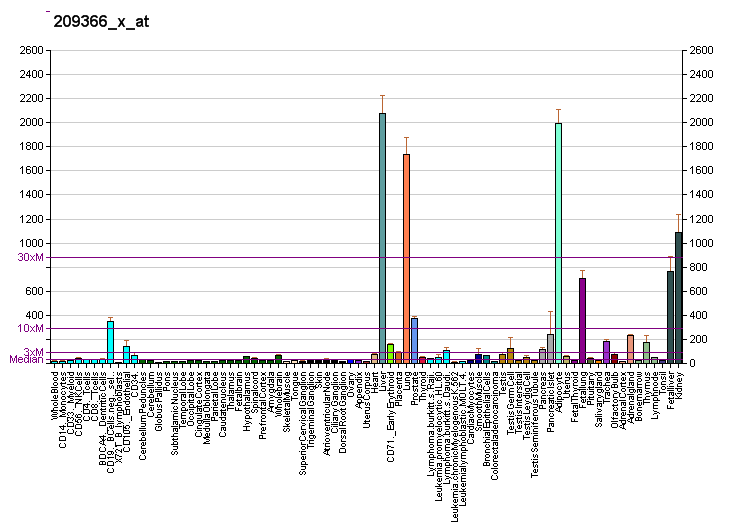

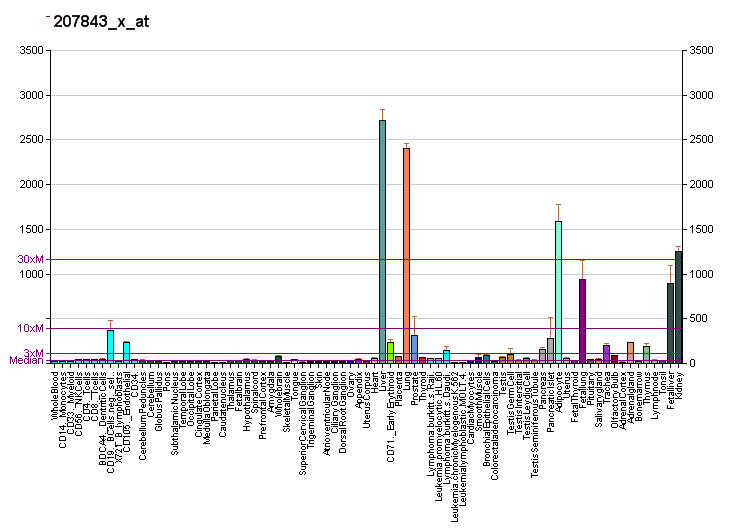
RNA expression pattern
Bgee	Human / Mouse (ortholog); Top expressed in: kidney tubule; right lobe of liver; renal medulla; glomerulus; pancreatic ductal cell; jejunal mucosa; metanephric glomerulus; body of pancreas; gallbladder; human kidney / Top expressed in: right kidney; olfactory epithelium; proximal tubule; gallbladder; transitional epithelium of urinary bladder; human kidney; gastrula; iris; left lobe of liver; decidua; More reference expression data
BioGPS	More reference expression data
Gene ontology
Molecular function	cytochrome-c oxidase activity; aldo-keto reductase (NADP) activity; metal ion binding; heme binding; enzyme binding
Cellular component	organelle membrane; integral component of membrane; endoplasmic reticulum membrane; membrane; intracellular membrane-bounded organelle; mitochondrial outer membrane; endoplasmic reticulum; mitochondrion; extracellular exosome; cytoplasm; cytosol
Biological process	response to cadmium ion; L-ascorbic acid metabolic process; proton transmembrane transport; electron transport chain
Sources:Amigo / QuickGO
Orthologs
Databases	NCBI: entry; OMA: entry
Species	Human	Mouse
Entrez	1528	109672
Ensembl	ENSG00000166347	ENSMUSG00000024646
UniProt	P00167	P56395
RefSeq (mRNA)	NM_001190807; NM_001914; NM_148923	NM_025797; NM_001348159
RefSeq (protein)	NP_001177736; NP_001905; NP_683725	NP_080073; NP_001335088
Location (UCSC)	Chr 18: 74.25 – 74.29 Mb	Chr 18: 84.86 – 84.9 Mb
PubMed search
- Wikidata
View/Edit Human	View/Edit Mouse

Cytochrome b5 type A, sometimes ambiguously just called cytochrome b5, is a protein that in humans is encoded by the gene CYB5A (previously CYB5). This protein is sometimes also called microsomal cytochrome b5, to distinguish it from its mitochondrial paralog cytochrome b5 type B.

Cytochrome b5 is a membrane bound hemoprotein which functions as an electron carrier for several membrane bound oxygenases. It has two isoforms produced by alternative splicing. Isoform 1 is bound to the cytoplasmic side of the endoplasmic reticulum. It has a C-terminal transmembrane alpha-helix. Isoform 2 was found in cytoplasm. A third protein, sometimes called cytochrome b5 outer mitochondrial membrane isoform is encoded by a separate gene CYB5B.

== Medical significance ==
Defects in CYB5A are the cause of type IV hereditary methemoglobinemia.

== See also ==
- Cytochrome b5 family
