= MTRR (gene) =

Protein-coding gene in the species Homo sapiens

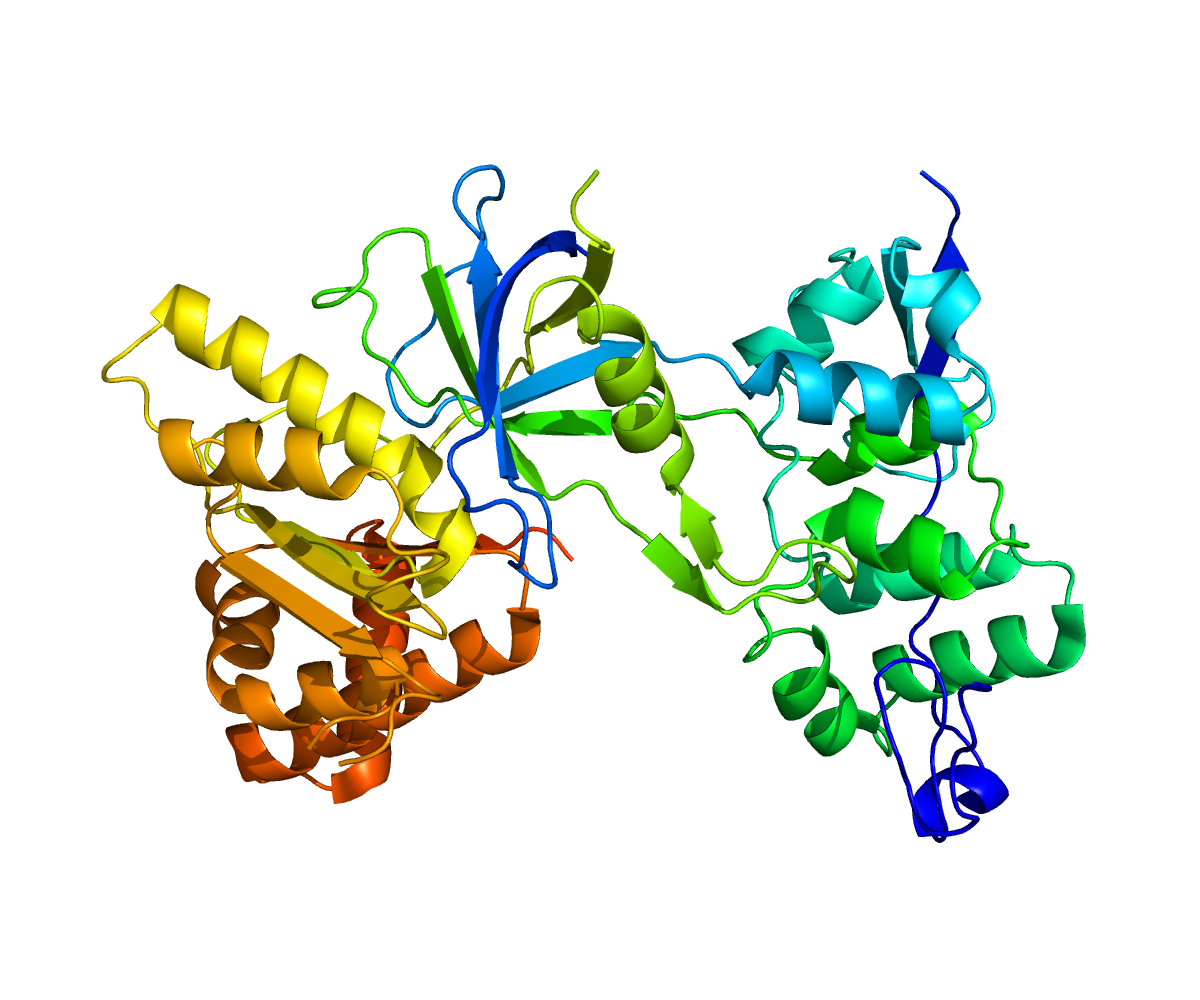

Identifiers
- Aliases: MTRR, MSR, cblE, 5-methyltetrahydrofolate-homocysteine methyltransferase reductase
- External IDs: OMIM: 602568; MGI: 1891037; GeneCards: MTRR
Available structures
PDB	Ortholog search: PDBe RCSB
PDB	List of PDB id codes 2QTL, 2QTZ
Enzyme activity
EC #	BRENDA	ExPASy	KEGG	MetaCyc
1.16.1.8	↗	↗	↗	↗

Gene location (Human)
Chr.	Chromosome 5 (human)
Band	5p15.31	Start	7,851,186 bp
Band	5p15.31	End	7,906,025 bp

Gene location (Mouse)
Chr.	Chromosome 13 (mouse)
Band	13 B3|13 35.54 cM	Start	68,708,899 bp
Band	13 B3|13 35.54 cM	End	68,730,268 bp
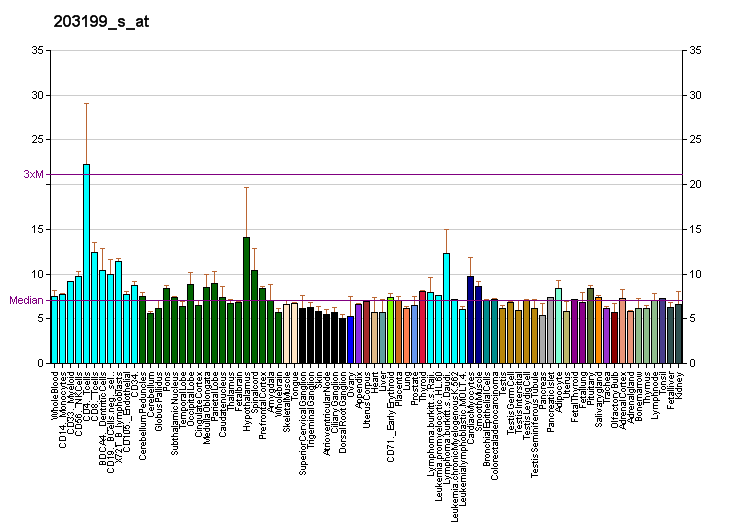

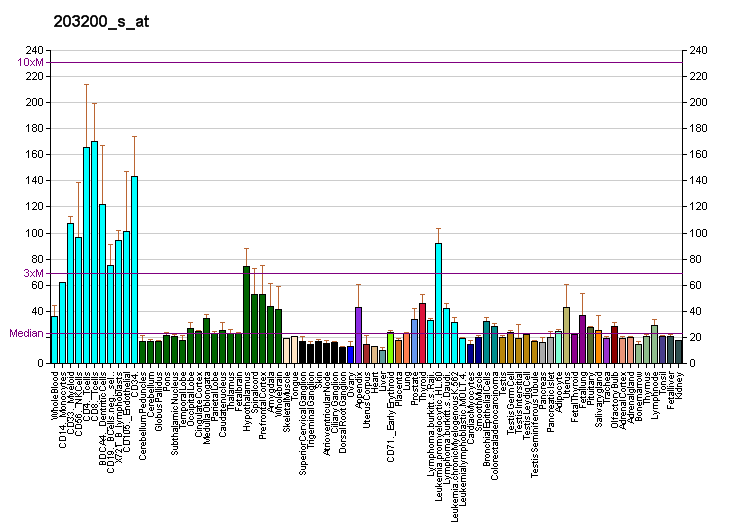
RNA expression pattern
Bgee	Human / Mouse (ortholog); Top expressed in: endothelial cell; pancreatic ductal cell; Epithelium of choroid plexus; upper lobe of left lung; biceps brachii; Skeletal muscle tissue of biceps brachii; kidney tubule; right ventricle; monocyte; rectum / Top expressed in: renal corpuscle; yolk sac; muscle of thigh; medullary collecting duct; tail of embryo; spermatocyte; genital tubercle; ureter; blastocyst; skeletal muscle tissue; More reference expression data
BioGPS	More reference expression data
Gene ontology
Molecular function	FMN binding; NADPH-hemoprotein reductase activity; flavin adenine dinucleotide binding; FAD binding; protein binding; NADP binding; NADPH binding; oxidoreductase activity, acting on metal ions, NAD or NADP as acceptor; oxidoreductase activity; (Methionine synthase) reductase; [methionine synthase reductase activity]
Cellular component	cytosol; cytoplasm
Biological process	cobalamin metabolic process; cellular amino acid biosynthetic process; methionine biosynthetic process; DNA methylation; methionine metabolic process; homocysteine catabolic process; folic acid metabolic process; negative regulation of cystathionine beta-synthase activity; S-adenosylmethionine cycle; homocysteine metabolic process; sulfur amino acid metabolic process; methylation
Sources:Amigo / QuickGO
Orthologs
Databases	NCBI: entry; OMA: entry
Species	Human	Mouse
Entrez	4552	210009
Ensembl	ENSG00000124275	ENSMUSG00000034617
UniProt	Q9UBK8	Q8C1A3
RefSeq (mRNA)	NM_002454; NM_024010	NM_172480; NM_001308475
RefSeq (protein)	NP_002445; NP_076915; NP_001351369; NP_001351370; NP_001351371	NP_001295404; NP_766068
Location (UCSC)	Chr 5: 7.85 – 7.91 Mb	Chr 13: 68.71 – 68.73 Mb
PubMed search
- Wikidata
View/Edit Human	View/Edit Mouse

Methionine synthase reductase, also known as MSR, is an enzyme in humans that is encoded by the M1T3R gene. It functions as the obligate reductase for methionine synthase and restores its cofactor to an active state allowing it to sustain folate and methionine metabolosis.

== Function ==
Methionine is an essential amino acid required for protein synthesis and one-carbon metabolism. Its synthesis is catalyzed by the enzyme methionine synthase. Methionine synthase eventually becomes inactive due to the oxidation of its cobalamin cofactor. Methionine synthase reductase regenerates a functional methionine synthase via reductive methylation. It is a member of the ferredoxin-NADP(+) reductase (FNR) family of electron transferases.

Methionine synthase reductase (MTRR) is primarily involved in the reductive methylation of homocysteine to methionine, utilizing methylcob(I)alamin as an intermediate methyl carrier. Methionine is an essential amino acid in mammals, necessary for protein synthesis and one carbon metabolism. In its activated form, S-adenosylmethionine (SAM) acts as a methyl donor in biological transmethylation reactions and as a propylamine donor in polyamine synthesis. A major product of methionine demethylation is homocysteine. Remethylation of homocysteine occurs via a cobalamin dependent enzyme, methionine synthase (MTR). The folate cycle is linked to homocysteine metabolism via MTR. Circulating blood folate (5-methyl tetrahydrofolate, 5-MTHF) donates methyl groups to MTR to be utilized in cellular methylation. A methyl cobalt bond of the intermediary methyl carrier, methlycob(III)alamin, is cleaved heterolytically producing cobalamin in its highly reactive oxidation state as cob(I)alamin. The enzyme bound cob(I)alamin cofactor of the MTR enzyme functions as a methyl carrier between 5-MTHF and homocysteine. Cob(I)alamin is oxidised to cob(II)alamin about once every 100 methyl transfer cycles, rendering the cob(I)alamin-MTR-enzyme complex inactive. Reactivation of this enzyme complex occurs through reductive remethylation by MTRR, utilizing S-adenosylmethionine as a methyl donor. MTR reactivation can also be NADPH dependent involving two redox proteins, soluble cytochrome b5 and reductase 1. However, this pathway is responsible for a minor role in reactivation, whilst MTRR remains a major contributor in this reductive reactivation.

Biological processes influenced by MTRR include:

- sulfur amino acid metabolic processes
- DNA methylation
- methionine metabolic processes
- methionine biosynthetic processes
- methylation
- S-adenosylmethionine (SAM) cycle
- homocysteine catabolic processes
- folic acid metabolic processes
- oxidation-reduction processes
- negative regulation of cystathionine beta-synthase activity.

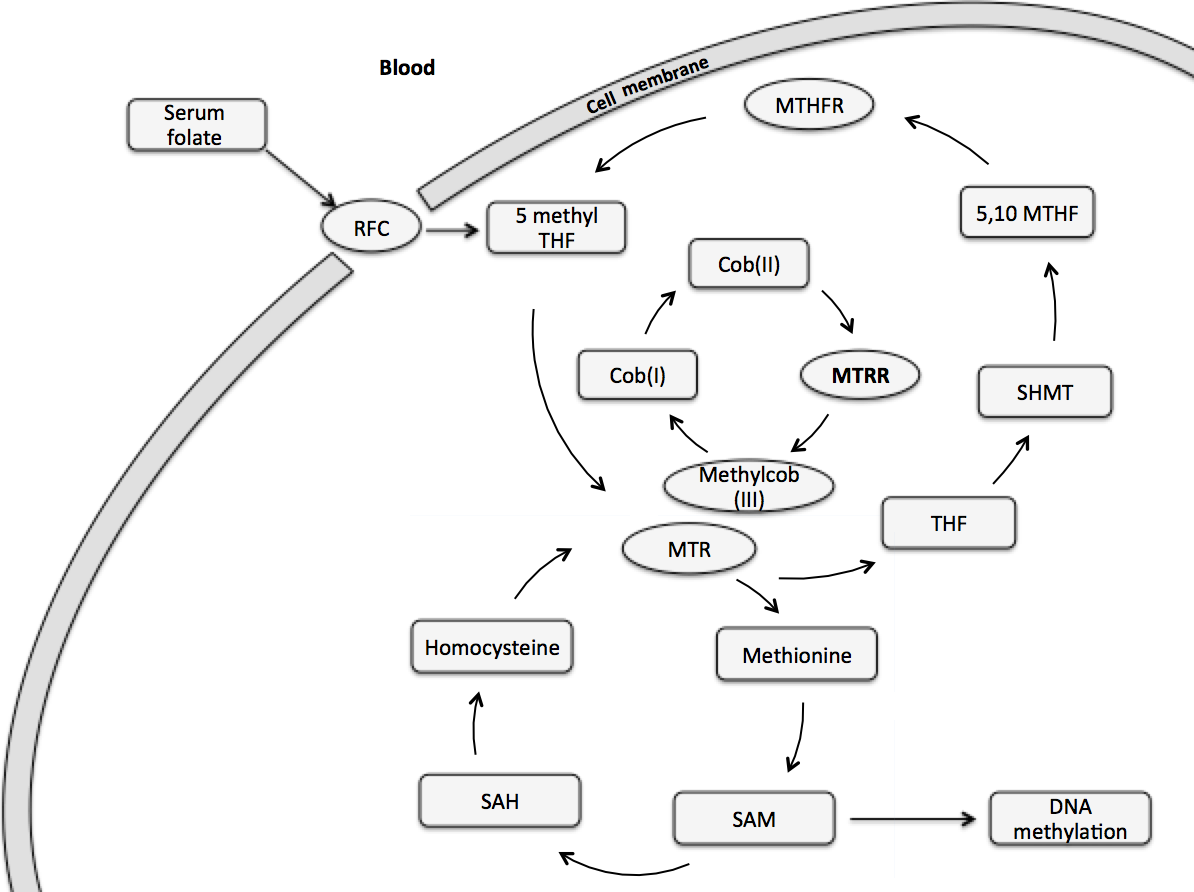
Simplified overview of relationship between homocysteine and folate metabolism. Pathways highlight the metabolic processes and polymorphisms mentioned. MTRR, Methionine synthase reductase; MTHFR, methylene tetrahydrofolate reductase; MTR, methionine synthase; SAH, S-adenosylhomocysteine; SAM, S-adenosylmethionine; THF, tetrahydrofolate; RFC, reduced folate carrier; 5methylTHF, 5 methyl tetrahydrofolate; Cob(I), cobalamin/cob(I)alamin/vitamin B12.

== MTRR gene ==
The Methionine Synthase Reductase (MTRR) gene primarily acts in the reductive regeneration of cob(I)alamin (vitamin B12). Cob(I)alamin is a cofactor that maintains activation of the methionine synthase enzyme (MTR) methionine synthase, linking folate and methionine metabolism. Donation of methyl groups from folate are utilized for cellular and DNA methylation, influencing epigenetic inheritance.

=== Aliases ===
- 5-Methyltetrahydrofolate-Homocysteine Methyltransferase Reductase
- MSR
- [Methionine Synthase]- Cobalamin Methyltransferase (Cob(II)Alamin Reducing)
- Methionine Synthase Reductase, Mitochondrial
- EC 1.16.1.8
- CblE

=== Mapping ===
The gene was mapped to human chromosome 5. Gene specific primer pairs resulted in PCR amplification of a product matched by size to a hybrid-mapping panel containing only chromosome 5 as its human genetic material. The product DNA sequence matched pre-established gene markers specific to this chromosome. Exact gene cytogenic position was determined by mapping to an artificial chromosomal construct containing the gene via fluorescence in situ hybridization. The exact MTRR gene location was mapped to 5p15.3-p15.2.

=== Structure ===
The MTRR gene is associated with a family of electron transferases known as the Ferredoxin-NADP(+) reductase (FNR) family. Found in 15 primates and over 16 tissues in humans, MTRR is 34 kb long. The gene comprises 15 exons and includes numerous cytolosic mitochondrial mRNA isoforms. Multiple cofactor binding sites assist in the maintenance of MTR activity via reductive remethylation. All binding domains involve selective and non-covalent interactions except the flavodoxin_1 domain.

== Co-factor binding sites ==
=== Flavodoxin-1 domain ===
Flavoproteins are ubiquitous biocatalysts binding specific redox active prosthetic groups. The domain is associated with electron transfer proteins and used in electron transport systems. The cofactor flavin-mononucleotide (FMN) is bound non-covalently to the domain, which is functionally interchangeable with iron-sulfur constituted proteins regulating electron transfer or ferredoxins.

==== FAD ====
Flavin adenine dinucleotide in its oxidized form, FAD is a cofactor of flavoprotein oxidoreductase enzymes. Flavoprotein pyridine nucleotide cytochrome reductases, including FAD catalyse the interchange of reducing equivalents (H+ or electrons). Initial electron donors and final electron acceptors comprise single electron carriers and two electron carrying nicotinamide dinucleotides respectively.

==== NAD ====
Evolutionary conserved protein domain corresponding to oxidoreductase activity. NAD binding catalyzes redox reactions to alter the oxidation state of metal ions, using NADP+ as an electron acceptor.

=== Methionine synthase reductase activity ===
Involved in the reductive remethylation of cob(II)alamin using S-adenosylmethionine as a methyl donor. Catalyses the reaction:

[methionine synthase]- cob(II)alamin + NADPH + H+ + S-adenosylmethionine → [methionine synthase]-methylcob(I)alamin + S-adenosylhomocysteine + NADP+.

=== Aquacobalamin reductase (NADPH) activity ===
Belongs to the oxidoreductase family, oxidizing metal ions with NADP+ acting as an electron acceptor. Uses FAD as a cofactor when catalyzing the following reaction:

2cob(II)alamin + NADP+ 2aquacob(III)alamin + NADPH + H+.

=== Flavin adenine dinucleotide ===
Interacts with the cofactor or prosthetic group, FAD of flavoproteins and contains a flavin moiety in the form of FAD or FMN (flavin mononucleotide). The domain non-covalently binds oxidized FAD or its reduced form, hydroquinone (FADH2).

==== FMN ====
Flavin mononucleotide binding domain interacts with a coenzyme of flavoprotein oxidoreductase enzymes, FMN.

==== NADP ====
Nicotinamide adenine dinucleotide phosphate is a coenzyme present in redox and biosynthetic reactions. The domain binds NADP in its oxidised or reduced forms as NADP+ or NADPH respectively.

==== ADPH ====
Involves a non-covalent and selective interaction with the reduced form of NADP, NADPH.

=== NADPH-hemoprotein reductase activity ===
The domain is associated with the oxidoreductase family and acts on NADH or NADPH, using a heme protein as an electron acceptor. Requires FAD and FMN as cofactors to catalyse the reaction:

NADPH + H+ + n oxidised hemoprotein = NADP+ + n reduced hemoprotein.

==== Protein binding ====
Binding domain involved in the interaction with proteins or protein complexes.

== Polymorphisms ==
=== Pathogenic mutations ===
- (MTRR):c.66A>G – Polymorphism resulting in isoleucine conversion to methionine at codon 22. This mutation is found within and affects the FMN binding domain.
- (MTRR):c.524C>T – Serine to leucine substitution at codon 175. Benign mutation associated with impaired intracellular cobalamin metabolism disorders.
- (MTRR):c.1049A>G – Lysine to arginine substitution at codon 350.
- (MTRR):c.1349C>G – Proline to arginine substitution at codon 450. Prevalence associated with abnormal intracellular cobalamin metabolism disorders.
- (MTRR):c.903+469T>C – Deep intronic insertion between exons 6 and 7 (r.903_904ins140). Threonine to cysteine change resulting in activation of an exon splicing enhancer in intron 6.
- (MTRR):c.1361C>T – Rare polymorphism involving serine to leucine substitution at codon 454. Known as the Iberian mutation, prevalent in homocystinuria megaloblastic anemia due to impaired cobalamin metabolism. Mainly three different halotypes (GTACG, GCACA, GCACG) from the deamination of methyl cytosine in different chromosomes.
- (MTRR):c.1459G>A – Involves glycine to arginine substitution at codon 487. Conserved in MTRR and found to occur within the FAD binding domain. Pathogenicity associated with inborn genetic diseases.
- (MTRR):c.1573C>T – Arginine substitution with a premature termination codon at codon 525.
- (MTRR):c.1622_1623dupTA – Results in formation of a premature termination codon. Pathogenicity associated with CblE type of homocystinuria.
- (MTRR):r.1462_1557del96 – Associated with splicing of exon 11 due to a 7 base pair deletion. A large deletion of this mutant allele results in the absence of a c-terminus in the FAD binding domain. Pathogenicity associated with CblE type of homocystinuria.
- (MTRR):c.1953-6_1953-2del5 – Novel mutation associated with CblE type of homocystinuria. Unstable mRNA arising from this mutant results in an absence of mRNA required for translation, producing pathogenicity.

Mutations involved in the formation of premature termination codons result in truncated mutated proteins if translated. Mutants exhibit an absence of FAD/NADPH binding domains and unstable mRNA due to nonsense mediated decay (NMD). NMD is not present in (MTRR):c.1573C>T or (MTRR):c.1622_1623dupTA polymorphisms. The (MTRR):c.903+469T>C variant is also associated with the formation of premature termination codons.

=== Other mutations ===
- (MTRR):c.1911G>A ¬– Benign synonymous mutation (alanine to alanine) at codon 637. Associated with disorders of cobalamin metabolism.

== Clinical significance ==
Single nucleotide polymorphisms (SNPs) in the MTRR gene impair MTR activity, resulting in elevated homocysteine levels due to compromised methylation to methionine. Elevated homocysteine levels are associated with birth defects in addition to pregnancy complications, cardiovascular disease, cancer, megaloblastic anemia, Alzheimer's diseases and cognitive dysfunction in the elderly. Presence of the mutant variant (66A>G) is associated with significantly lower, up to 4 fold, plasma cobalamin and folate levels in cardiac transplant patients. A consequent decrease in S-adenosylmethionine availability results in DNA hypomethylation. Low folate limits one carbon metabolism and homocysteine metabolism as vitamin B12 interacts with folate in this pathway. Additionally, this mutation is associated with an increased risk in type 2 diabetes.

=== Cancer ===
Specific SNPs are associated with an elevated risk of lung cancer and interact with folate dietary intake in this etiology. The (MTRR):c.66A>G mutation relates to a significant increase in the risk of lung cancer. When co-expressed with the polymorphism (MTR): 2756A>G, lung cancer risk is further increased in a dose dependent manner. Correlation between this polymorphism and increased risk of lung cancer is present with low folate intake and high vitamin B12, suggesting a B12 independent mechanism of action. This mutation is also associated with an increased risk in colorectal cancer, acute lymphoblastic leukemia, bladder cancer, cervical intraepithelial neoplasia, non-Hodgkin lymphoma and esophageal squamous cell carcinoma.

=== CblE type of homocystinuria ===
Remethylation of homocysteine to methionine by MTR requires the derivative of cobalamin, methylcobalamin. Cobalamin metabolism is initiated by the endocytosis of cobalamin bound to the plasma protein transcobalamin (II). Cleavage of this complex produces free cobalamin, translocating from lysosome to cytoplasm. Conversion can occur to 5'-deoxyadenosylcobalamin (AdoCbl) activating the mitochondrial enzyme methylmalonly coenzyme A mutase or to methylcobalamin (MeCbl). An error in cobalamin metabolism resulting in decreased MeCbl and unaffected AdoCbl is characteristic of the CblE type of homocystinuria. This complementation is rare with autosomal recessive inheritance. The inherited methionine synthase functional deficiency corresponds to a defect in the reducing system required to activate the MTR enzyme. Symptoms of this condition comprise developmental retardation, megaloblastic anemia, homocystinuria, hypomethioninemia, cerebral atrophy and hyperhomocysteinemia. However, hypomethioninemia remains an inconsistent symptom. Decreased MeCbl alongside normal cobalamin uptake is suggestive of decreased intracellular methionine biosynthesis. Occurring mainly in childhood, 15 pathogenic mutations can be associated with CblE type homocystinuria. Additionally, vascular abnormalities are associated with this defect. Impaired reduction of an oxidised cobalt atom in the active site of MTR is associated with this condition, where enzyme activity can be corrected with reducing agents. Rare polymorphisms related to this disease include (MTRR):c.1459G>A, (MTRR):c.1623-1624insTA and (MTRR):c.903+469T>C. These mutations, excluding (MTRR):c.1459G>A result in a frame shift, producing premature termination codons. As consequent products are distant from normal, mutant mRNA arises and nonsense mediated decay (FMN) is initiated. The large insertion of 903_904ins140 corresponding to 903+469T>C is most prevalent in CblE pathology. The activation of an enhanced splicer within intron 6 is incomplete, producing small quantities of normal spliced MTRR mRNA. Prenatal diagnosis of this condition is possible using [14C] methyltetrahydrofolate. Mutation analysis in native chorionic villi and [14C] formate in amino acids within these villi or cultured amniocytes is indicative of the CblE defect. Additionally, macrocytic anemia is a typical feature of the CblE defect and can be corrected though OH-Cobalamin administration or folate supplementation.

=== Coronary artery disease ===
Homocysteine, a sulfur based amino acid is the main product of methionine demethylation. Elevated homocysteine is an independent risk factor for cardiovascular disease and inversely correlated to consumed vitamin B12/B6 and folate levels. Homocysteine methylation to methionine is catalyzed by MTR, resulting in appropriate intracellular levels of methionine and tetrahydrofolate, alongside non-toxic homocysteine levels. The GG phenotype promotes the development of premature coronary artery disease (CAD) independent of hyperhomocysteinemia. Hyperhomocysteinemia is associated with cerebral, coronary and peripheral atherosclerotic pathology as it promotes endothelial cell dysfunction, platelet adhesion and vascular smooth muscle cell proliferation. DNA damage and homocysteine levels are proportional to CAD severity. Micronucleus frequency in human lymphocytes, dependent on homocysteine levels increases reactive oxygen species and uracil incorporation in DNA methylation, promoting genetic alterations and point mutations. The (MTRR):c.66A>G, polymorphism containing chromosome is prone to fragmentation. This chromosomal loss or global DNA hypomethylation results in under condensation of pericentromeric heterochromatin, micronucleus formation and elevated risks of aneuploidy. Co-expression of this mutation and the 677T polymorphism in methionine tetrahydrofolate reductase (MTHFR) Methylenetetrahydrofolate reductase act to further the extent of DNA damage.

Hypomethylation due to impaired methylation up regulates atherosclerotic susceptible genes whilst down regulating atherosclerosis protective genes. This abnormality is present during the atherosclerotic pathology, increasing transcriptional activity of platelet derived growth factor (PDGF) and promoting smooth muscle cell proliferation.

=== Neural tube defects ===
==== Spina bifida ====
MTRR requires vitamin B12 for maintenance of the methyl synthase reaction whilst folate is needed for normal synthesis of nucleotide precursors. These ensure normal DNA synthesis and cellular methylation reactions. Chronic folate or methyl deficiencies are thereby linked to abnormal DNA methylation. The 66A>G polymorphism is up-regulated in neural tube defects and increases the risk of spina bifida by two-fold. Homozygosis for this mutation is an established maternal risk factor for spina bifida especially with low intracellular vitamin B12 in the circulation or amniotic fluid. Vitamin B12 is reflected by plasma methylmalonic acid (MMA), an elevation in which indicates impaired B12 uptake or metabolism. A raised MMA combined with the MTRR mutation corresponds to a 5-fold increase in spina bifida. The mechanism of action of this polymorphism is through the mother, hence there is no preferential transmission of this mutation from parent to child. Abnormal MTRR binding to the MTR-cob(I)alamin-enzyme complex down regulates the rate of homocysteine methylation. Consequent decreases in methionine and S-adenosylmethionine negatively affect DNA, gene and protein methylation, all of which are involved in neural tube closure. Increased proliferation during neurulation decreases the availability of DNA nucleotides. As these are unable to be replaced due to impaired DNA methylation and nucleotide formation, consequent disturbed neurulation results in the formation of neural tube defects. Co-expression of this mutation with the 677C>T MTHFR polymorphism furthers the risk of spina bifida compared to an independent acting 66A>G mutation.

==== Down syndrome ====
Trisomy 21 or Down syndrome is the most common human chromosomal anomaly arising from abnormal chromosomal segregation in meiosis. The condition can occur during anaphase in meiosis(I) marking oocyte maturation before ovulation and/or during anaphase in meiosis (II) signifying fertilization. Metabolic impact during these stages is furthered by low vitamin B12. Methylation of homocysteine to methionine is affected, primarily by the (MTRR):c.66A>G polymorphism. Chronic homocysteine elevation increases s-adenosyl-L-homocysteine levels, consequently inhibiting methyltransferase activity and promoting DNA hypomethylation. Mothers homozygous for this mutation (GG phenotype) are at a greater risk of having a child with down syndrome compared to heterozygotes (GA phenotype). Geographically, Irish populations are more likely to be homogenous whilst north American populations are commonly heterogeneous, resulting in a greater incidence of the polymorphism in the former group. The homozygous mutant allele promotes DNA hypomethylation and meiotic non-disjunction, increasing the risk of down syndrome. This polymorphism correlates to a 2.5 fold risk increase independently and a 4 fold increase in risk when co-expressed with the 677C>T MTHFR mutation. Combination with the MTR2756A>G genetic polymorphism further elevates down syndrome risk.

== See also ==
- Methionine synthase
