= Pyridine nucleotide transferase =

Pyridine nucleotide transferase may stand for

- NAD(P)+ transhydrogenase (Re/Si-specific)
- NAD(P)+ transhydrogenase (Si-specific)
