= Cytochrome b5 type B =

Protein-coding gene found in humans

CYB5B

Identifiers
- Aliases: CYB5B, CYB5-M, CYPB5M, OMB5, cytochrome b5 type B
- External IDs: OMIM: 611964; MGI: 1913677; GeneCards: CYB5B
Available structures
| PDB | Ortholog search: PDBe RCSB |
| PDB | List of PDB id codes 3NER |

Gene location (Human)
| Chr. | Chromosome 16 (human) |
| Band | 16q22.1 | Start | 69,398,402 bp |
| Band | 16q22.1 | End | 69,466,264 bp |

Gene location (Mouse)
| Chr. | Chromosome 8 (mouse) |
| Band | 8|8 D3 | Start | 107,877,272 bp |
| Band | 8|8 D3 | End | 107,914,103 bp |
RNA expression pattern
| Bgee | Human / Mouse (ortholog); Top expressed in: right adrenal cortex; left adrenal gland; left adrenal cortex; rectum; mucosa of transverse colon; ganglionic eminence; stromal cell of endometrium; islet of Langerhans; ventricular zone; gallbladder / Top expressed in: adrenal gland; transitional epithelium of urinary bladder; duodenum; jejunum; left lobe of liver; Ileal epithelium; right kidney; human kidney; brown adipose tissue; seminal vesicula; More reference expression data |
| BioGPS | n/a |
Gene ontology
| Molecular function | heme binding; metal ion binding; protein binding |
| Cellular component | integral component of membrane; mitochondrion; membrane; mitochondrial outer membrane |
| Biological process | xenobiotic metabolic process |
Sources:Amigo / QuickGO
Orthologs
| Databases | NCBI: entry; OMA: entry |
| Species | Human | Mouse |
| Entrez | 80777 | 66427 |
| Ensembl | ENSG00000103018 | ENSMUSG00000031924 |
| UniProt | O43169 | Q9CQX2 |
| RefSeq (mRNA) | NM_030579 | NM_025558 |
| RefSeq (protein) | NP_085056 | NP_079834 |
| Location (UCSC) | Chr 16: 69.4 – 69.47 Mb | Chr 8: 107.88 – 107.91 Mb |
| PubMed search |
- Wikidata
| View/Edit Human | View/Edit Mouse |

Cytochrome b5 type B, also called cytochrome b5 outer mitochondrial membrane isoform, is a protein that in humans is encoded by the gene CYB5B. This protein is a heme-binding protein from the cytochrome b5 family. Unlike its paralog CYB5A (sometimes just called cytochrome b5), CYB5B is located in the mitochondrial outer membrane.
