= Cytochrome b5 family =

Protein family

Cytochrome b5
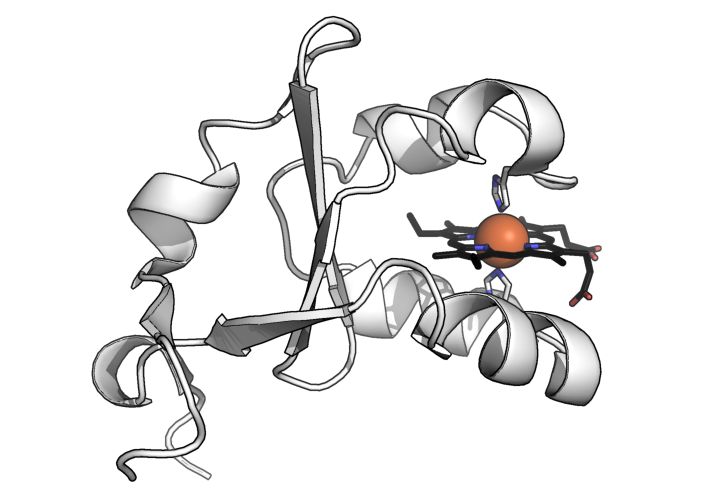
- Cytochrome B5 (rat) bound to its cofactor. Haem in black, iron in orange and iron-binding histidine residues shown as sticks. (PDB: 1ICC)

Identifiers
- Symbol: Cyt_B5
- Pfam: PF00173
- InterPro: IPR001199
- PROSITE: PDOC00170
- Membranome: 211
Available protein structures:
- PDB: IPR001199 PF00173 (ECOD; PDBsum)
- AlphaFold: IPR001199; PF00173

The cytochrome b5 family is a family of heme-binding proteins related to cytochrome b5, type A (sometimes just called cytochrome b5). Cytochromes b5 are ubiquitous electron transport hemoproteins found in animals, plants, fungi and purple phototrophic bacteria.

The microsomal (CYB5A) and mitochondrial (CYB5B) variants are membrane-bound, while bacterial and those from erythrocytes and other animal tissues are water-soluble. The family of cytochrome b_{5}-like proteins includes (besides cytochrome b_{5} itself) hemoprotein domains covalently associated with other redox domains in flavocytochrome cytochrome b_{2} (L-lactate dehydrogenase; EC 1.1.2.3), sulfite oxidase (EC 1.8.3.1), plant and fungal nitrate reductases (EC 1.7.1.1, EC 1.7.1.2, EC 1.7.1.3), and plant and fungal cytochrome b_{5}/acyl lipid desaturase fusion proteins.

== Structure ==
3-D structures of a number of cytochrome b_{5} and yeast flavocytochrome b_{2} are known. The fold belongs to the α+β class, with two hydrophobic cores on each side of a β-sheet. The larger hydrophobic core constitutes the heme-binding pocket, closed off on each side by a pair of helices connected by a turn. The smaller hydrophobic core may have only a structural role and is formed by spatially close N-terminal and C-terminal segments. The two histidine residues provide the fifth and sixth heme ligands, and the propionate edge of the heme group lies at the opening of the heme crevice. Two isomers of cytochrome b_{5}, referred to as the A (major) and B (minor) forms, differ by a 180° rotation of the heme about an axis defined by the α- and γ-meso carbons.

== Cytochrome b_{5} in some biochemical reactions ==
EC 1.6.2.2 cytochrome-b_{5} reductase

NADH + H^{+} + 2 ferricytochrome b_{5} → NAD^{+} + 2 ferrocytochrome b_{5}

EC 1.10.2.1 L-ascorbate—cytochrome-b_{5} reductase

L-ascorbate + ferricytochrome b_{5} → monodehydroascorbate + ferrocytochrome b_{5}

EC 1.14.18.2 CMP-N-acetylneuraminate monooxygenase

CMP-N-acetylneuraminate + 2 ferrocytochrome b_{5} + O_{2} + 2 H^{+} → CMP-N-glycoloylneuraminate + 2 ferricytochrome b_{5} + H_{2}O

EC 1.14.19.1 stearoyl-CoA 9-desaturase

stearoyl-CoA + 2 ferrocytochrome b_{5} + O_{2} + 2 H^{+} → oleoyl-CoA + 2 ferricytochrome b_{5} + H_{2}O

EC 1.14.19.3 linoleoyl-CoA 9-desaturase

linoleoyl-CoA + 2 ferrocytochrome b_{5} + O_{2} + 2 H^{+} → γ-linolenoyl-CoA + 2 ferricytochrome b_{5} + H_{2}O

== See also ==
- Cytochrome b
- Cytochrome b_{5} deficiency
- P450-containing systems
