= NADPH-diaphorase =

NADPH-diaphorase may refer to:

- NADPH dehydrogenase
- Nitric oxide synthase
