= NDOR1 =

Protein-coding gene in the species Homo sapiens

Identifiers
- Aliases: NDOR1, NR1, bA350O14.9, NADPH dependent diflavin oxidoreductase 1, CIAE1
- External IDs: OMIM: 606073; MGI: 1926047; GeneCards: NDOR1
Available structures
PDB	Ortholog search: PDBe RCSB
PDB	List of PDB id codes 4H2D

Gene location (Human)
Chr.	Chromosome 9 (human)
Band	9q34.3	Start	137,205,685 bp
Band	9q34.3	End	137,219,361 bp
RNA expression pattern
Bgee	Human / Mouse (ortholog); Top expressed in: granulocyte; mucosa of transverse colon; right lobe of thyroid gland; apex of heart; right hemisphere of cerebellum; spleen; right uterine tube; left lobe of thyroid gland; body of stomach; tibial nerve / n/a; More reference expression data
BioGPS	n/a
Gene ontology
Molecular function	oxidoreductase activity; FMN binding; NADPH-hemoprotein reductase activity; protein binding; flavin adenine dinucleotide binding; NADP binding; oxidoreductase activity, acting on NAD(P)H
Cellular component	cytoplasm; perinuclear region of cytoplasm; cytosol; intermediate filament cytoskeleton; nucleus
Biological process	cell death; cellular response to menadione; iron-sulfur cluster assembly
Sources:Amigo / QuickGO
Orthologs
Databases	NCBI: entry; OMA: entry
Species	Human	Mouse
Entrez	27158	78797
Ensembl	ENSG00000188566	ENSMUSG00000006471
UniProt	Q9UHB4	A2AI05
RefSeq (mRNA)	NM_001144026; NM_001144027; NM_001144028; NM_014434	NM_001082476; NM_001252541; NM_001252542; NM_178239
RefSeq (protein)	NP_001137498; NP_001137499; NP_001137500; NP_055249	NP_001075945; NP_001239470; NP_001239471
Location (UCSC)	Chr 9: 137.21 – 137.22 Mb	n/a
PubMed search
- Wikidata
View/Edit Human	View/Edit Mouse

NADPH-dependent diflavin oxidoreductase 1 is an enzyme that in humans is encoded by the NDOR1 gene.
