= CYB5R2 =

Protein-coding gene in the species Homo sapiens

Identifiers
- Aliases: CYB5R2, B5R.2, cytochrome b5 reductase 2
- External IDs: OMIM: 608342; MGI: 2444415; GeneCards: CYB5R2
Enzyme activity
EC #	BRENDA	ExPASy	KEGG	MetaCyc
1.6.2.2	↗	↗	↗	↗

Gene location (Human)
Chr.	Chromosome 11 (human)
Band	11p15.4	Start	7,665,100 bp
Band	11p15.4	End	7,677,222 bp

Gene location (Mouse)
Chr.	Chromosome 7 (mouse)
Band	7|7 E3	Start	107,347,662 bp
Band	7|7 E3	End	107,357,239 bp
RNA expression pattern
Bgee	Human / Mouse (ortholog); Top expressed in: left testis; right testis; tibial nerve; sperm; sural nerve; skin of abdomen; skin of leg; olfactory zone of nasal mucosa; minor salivary glands; C1 segment / Top expressed in: zygote; spermatid; lens; sciatic nerve; secondary oocyte; morula; embryo; muscle of thigh; spermatocyte; seminiferous tubule; More reference expression data
BioGPS	n/a
Gene ontology
Molecular function	oxidoreductase activity; protein binding; cytochrome-b5 reductase activity, acting on NAD(P)H; FAD binding
Cellular component	nucleus; membrane; endoplasmic reticulum membrane; mitochondrion
Biological process	steroid metabolic process; sterol biosynthetic process; steroid biosynthetic process; lipid metabolism; bicarbonate transport
Sources:Amigo / QuickGO
Orthologs
Databases	NCBI: entry; OMA: entry
Species	Human	Mouse
Entrez	51700	320635
Ensembl	ENSG00000166394	ENSMUSG00000048065
UniProt	Q6BCY4	Q3KNK3
RefSeq (mRNA)	NM_001001336; NM_001302826; NM_001302827; NM_016229	NM_001205227; NM_177216
RefSeq (protein)	NP_001289755; NP_001289756; NP_057313	NP_001192156; NP_796190
Location (UCSC)	Chr 11: 7.67 – 7.68 Mb	Chr 7: 107.35 – 107.36 Mb
PubMed search
- Wikidata
View/Edit Human	View/Edit Mouse

Cytochrome b5 reductase 2 is an enzyme that in humans is encoded by the CYB5R2 gene.
