= CYB5R1 =

Protein-coding gene in humans

Identifiers
- Aliases: CYB5R1, B5R.1, B5R1, B5R2, NQO3A2, humb5R2, cytochrome b5 reductase 1
- External IDs: OMIM: 608341; MGI: 1919267; GeneCards: CYB5R1
Enzyme activity
EC #	BRENDA	ExPASy	KEGG	MetaCyc
1.6.2.2	↗	↗	↗	↗

Gene location (Human)
Chr.	Chromosome 1 (human)
Band	1q32.1	Start	202,961,873 bp
Band	1q32.1	End	202,967,275 bp

Gene location (Mouse)
Chr.	Chromosome 1 (mouse)
Band	1|1 E4	Start	134,333,297 bp
Band	1|1 E4	End	134,339,478 bp
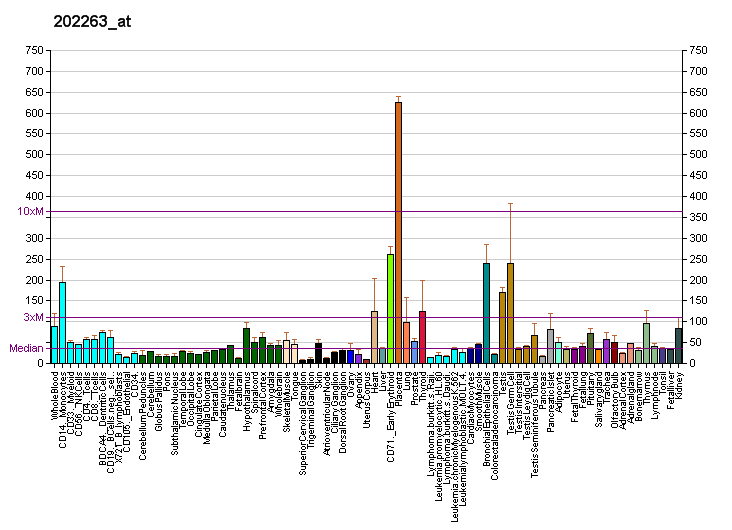
RNA expression pattern
Bgee	Human / Mouse (ortholog); Top expressed in: Skeletal muscle tissue of biceps brachii; gastrocnemius muscle; glutes; muscle of thigh; deltoid muscle; vastus lateralis muscle; body of tongue; Skeletal muscle tissue of rectus abdominis; triceps brachii muscle; tibialis anterior muscle / Top expressed in: stroma of bone marrow; plantaris muscle; triceps brachii muscle; temporal muscle; vastus lateralis muscle; calvaria; extraocular muscle; sternocleidomastoid muscle; muscle of thigh; digastric muscle; More reference expression data
BioGPS	More reference expression data
Gene ontology
Molecular function	protein binding; cytochrome-b5 reductase activity, acting on NAD(P)H; oxidoreductase activity; FAD binding
Cellular component	integral component of membrane; extracellular exosome; plasma membrane; endoplasmic reticulum membrane; membrane; mitochondrion; platelet alpha granule membrane
Biological process	steroid metabolic process; sterol biosynthetic process; positive regulation of protein targeting to mitochondrion; lipid metabolism; steroid biosynthetic process; platelet degranulation; bicarbonate transport
Sources:Amigo / QuickGO
Orthologs
Databases	NCBI: entry; OMA: entry
Species	Human	Mouse
Entrez	51706	72017
Ensembl	ENSG00000159348	ENSMUSG00000026456
UniProt	Q9UHQ9	Q9DB73
RefSeq (mRNA)	NM_016243	NM_028057; NM_001355133
RefSeq (protein)	NP_057327	NP_082333; NP_001342062
Location (UCSC)	Chr 1: 202.96 – 202.97 Mb	Chr 1: 134.33 – 134.34 Mb
PubMed search
- Wikidata
View/Edit Human	View/Edit Mouse

NADH-cytochrome b5 reductase 1 is an enzyme that in humans is encoded by the CYB5R1 gene.

== Structure ==
The CYB5R1 gene is located on the 1st chromosome, with its specific location being 1q32.1. The gene contains 9 exons. CYB5R1 encodes a 34.1 kDa protein that is composed of 305 amino acids; 56 peptides have been observed through mass spectrometry data.
