= CYB5R4 =

Protein-coding gene in the species Homo sapiens

Identifiers
- Aliases: CYB5R4, NCB5OR, cb5/cb5R, dJ676J13.1, cytochrome b5 reductase 4
- External IDs: OMIM: 608343; MGI: 2386848; GeneCards: CYB5R4
Available structures
PDB	Ortholog search: PDBe RCSB
PDB	List of PDB id codes 3LF5
Enzyme activity
EC #	BRENDA	ExPASy	KEGG	MetaCyc
1.6.2.2	↗	↗	↗	↗

Gene location (Human)
Chr.	Chromosome 6 (human)
Band	6q14.2	Start	83,859,656 bp
Band	6q14.2	End	83,967,423 bp

Gene location (Mouse)
Chr.	Chromosome 9 (mouse)
Band	9|9 E3.1	Start	86,904,067 bp
Band	9|9 E3.1	End	86,959,827 bp
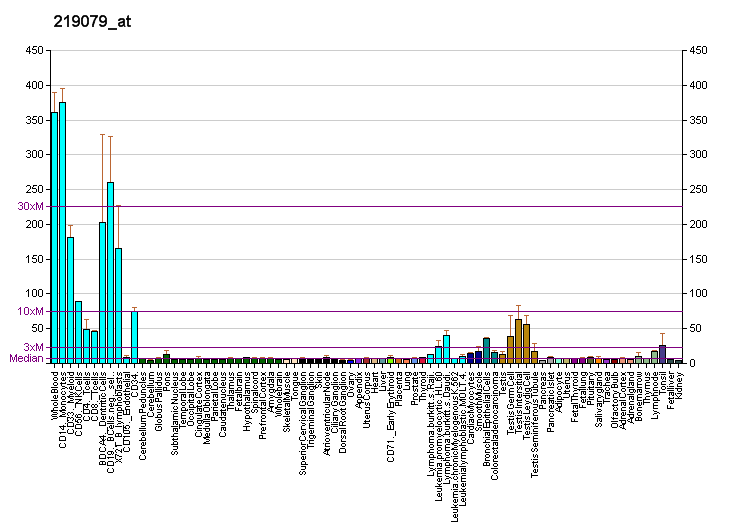
RNA expression pattern
Bgee	Human / Mouse (ortholog); Top expressed in: monocyte; sperm; blood; bone marrow; granulocyte; bone marrow cell; right testis; left testis; appendix; islet of Langerhans / Top expressed in: granulocyte; ileum; ganglionic eminence; jejunum; zygote; quadriceps femoris muscle; duodenum; neural tube; tail of embryo; ventricular zone; More reference expression data
BioGPS	More reference expression data
Gene ontology
Molecular function	oxidoreductase activity; NAD(P)H oxidase H2O2-forming activity; oxidoreductase activity, acting on NAD(P)H, heme protein as acceptor; heme binding; metal ion binding; cytochrome-b5 reductase activity, acting on NAD(P)H
Cellular component	perinuclear region of cytoplasm; endoplasmic reticulum; endoplasmic reticulum membrane
Biological process	response to antibiotic; insulin secretion; detection of oxygen; generation of precursor metabolites and energy; glucose homeostasis; superoxide metabolic process; cell development; bicarbonate transport
Sources:Amigo / QuickGO
Orthologs
Databases	NCBI: entry; OMA: entry
Species	Human	Mouse
Entrez	51167	266690
Ensembl	ENSG00000065615	ENSMUSG00000032872
UniProt	Q7L1T6	Q3TDX8
RefSeq (mRNA)	NM_016230	NM_024195; NM_001359962
RefSeq (protein)	NP_057314	NP_077157; NP_001346891
Location (UCSC)	Chr 6: 83.86 – 83.97 Mb	Chr 9: 86.9 – 86.96 Mb
PubMed search
- Wikidata
View/Edit Human	View/Edit Mouse

Cytochrome b5 reductase 4 is an enzyme that in humans is encoded by the CYB5R4 gene.

NCB5OR is a flavohemoprotein that contains functional domains found in both cytochrome b5 (CYB5; MIM 250790) and CYB5 reductase (DIA1; MIM 250800).[supplied by OMIM]
